

207001–207100 

|-bgcolor=#fefefe
| 207001 ||  || — || October 7, 2004 || Palomar || NEAT || — || align=right | 1.1 km || 
|-id=002 bgcolor=#fefefe
| 207002 ||  || — || October 8, 2004 || Kitt Peak || Spacewatch || MAS || align=right data-sort-value="0.92" | 920 m || 
|-id=003 bgcolor=#fefefe
| 207003 ||  || — || October 9, 2004 || Kitt Peak || Spacewatch || FLO || align=right data-sort-value="0.85" | 850 m || 
|-id=004 bgcolor=#fefefe
| 207004 ||  || — || October 9, 2004 || Kitt Peak || Spacewatch || FLO || align=right data-sort-value="0.91" | 910 m || 
|-id=005 bgcolor=#fefefe
| 207005 ||  || — || October 9, 2004 || Kitt Peak || Spacewatch || FLO || align=right | 1.2 km || 
|-id=006 bgcolor=#fefefe
| 207006 ||  || — || October 9, 2004 || Kitt Peak || Spacewatch || NYS || align=right data-sort-value="0.88" | 880 m || 
|-id=007 bgcolor=#fefefe
| 207007 ||  || — || October 9, 2004 || Kitt Peak || Spacewatch || NYS || align=right data-sort-value="0.67" | 670 m || 
|-id=008 bgcolor=#fefefe
| 207008 ||  || — || October 7, 2004 || Palomar || NEAT || — || align=right | 1.1 km || 
|-id=009 bgcolor=#fefefe
| 207009 ||  || — || October 9, 2004 || Socorro || LINEAR || FLO || align=right data-sort-value="0.98" | 980 m || 
|-id=010 bgcolor=#fefefe
| 207010 ||  || — || October 11, 2004 || Kitt Peak || Spacewatch || — || align=right data-sort-value="0.89" | 890 m || 
|-id=011 bgcolor=#fefefe
| 207011 ||  || — || October 11, 2004 || Kitt Peak || Spacewatch || — || align=right data-sort-value="0.93" | 930 m || 
|-id=012 bgcolor=#fefefe
| 207012 ||  || — || October 12, 2004 || Kitt Peak || Spacewatch || FLO || align=right data-sort-value="0.80" | 800 m || 
|-id=013 bgcolor=#E9E9E9
| 207013 ||  || — || October 11, 2004 || Kitt Peak || M. W. Buie || — || align=right | 1.1 km || 
|-id=014 bgcolor=#fefefe
| 207014 ||  || — || October 21, 2004 || Socorro || LINEAR || V || align=right data-sort-value="0.89" | 890 m || 
|-id=015 bgcolor=#fefefe
| 207015 ||  || — || November 2, 2004 || Anderson Mesa || LONEOS || — || align=right | 1.2 km || 
|-id=016 bgcolor=#fefefe
| 207016 ||  || — || November 3, 2004 || Kitt Peak || Spacewatch || MAS || align=right data-sort-value="0.96" | 960 m || 
|-id=017 bgcolor=#E9E9E9
| 207017 ||  || — || November 3, 2004 || Kitt Peak || Spacewatch || — || align=right | 1.5 km || 
|-id=018 bgcolor=#fefefe
| 207018 ||  || — || November 3, 2004 || Anderson Mesa || LONEOS || — || align=right | 1.3 km || 
|-id=019 bgcolor=#fefefe
| 207019 ||  || — || November 3, 2004 || Palomar || NEAT || FLO || align=right | 1.6 km || 
|-id=020 bgcolor=#FA8072
| 207020 ||  || — || November 4, 2004 || Anderson Mesa || LONEOS || — || align=right | 1.2 km || 
|-id=021 bgcolor=#E9E9E9
| 207021 ||  || — || November 5, 2004 || Palomar || NEAT || — || align=right | 3.2 km || 
|-id=022 bgcolor=#fefefe
| 207022 ||  || — || November 7, 2004 || Socorro || LINEAR || NYS || align=right | 2.8 km || 
|-id=023 bgcolor=#fefefe
| 207023 ||  || — || November 4, 2004 || Kitt Peak || Spacewatch || — || align=right | 1.7 km || 
|-id=024 bgcolor=#fefefe
| 207024 ||  || — || November 4, 2004 || Kitt Peak || Spacewatch || NYS || align=right data-sort-value="0.81" | 810 m || 
|-id=025 bgcolor=#fefefe
| 207025 ||  || — || November 7, 2004 || Socorro || LINEAR || FLO || align=right data-sort-value="0.89" | 890 m || 
|-id=026 bgcolor=#fefefe
| 207026 ||  || — || November 7, 2004 || Socorro || LINEAR || — || align=right | 1.4 km || 
|-id=027 bgcolor=#FA8072
| 207027 ||  || — || November 9, 2004 || Catalina || CSS || — || align=right | 1.0 km || 
|-id=028 bgcolor=#fefefe
| 207028 ||  || — || November 10, 2004 || Wrightwood || J. W. Young || V || align=right data-sort-value="0.97" | 970 m || 
|-id=029 bgcolor=#fefefe
| 207029 ||  || — || November 10, 2004 || Kitt Peak || Spacewatch || NYS || align=right data-sort-value="0.88" | 880 m || 
|-id=030 bgcolor=#fefefe
| 207030 ||  || — || November 12, 2004 || Catalina || CSS || — || align=right data-sort-value="0.90" | 900 m || 
|-id=031 bgcolor=#fefefe
| 207031 ||  || — || November 4, 2004 || Kitt Peak || Spacewatch || — || align=right | 2.2 km || 
|-id=032 bgcolor=#E9E9E9
| 207032 ||  || — || November 10, 2004 || Kitt Peak || Spacewatch || — || align=right | 1.0 km || 
|-id=033 bgcolor=#fefefe
| 207033 ||  || — || November 17, 2004 || Campo Imperatore || CINEOS || — || align=right | 1.3 km || 
|-id=034 bgcolor=#fefefe
| 207034 ||  || — || November 17, 2004 || Campo Imperatore || CINEOS || NYS || align=right data-sort-value="0.82" | 820 m || 
|-id=035 bgcolor=#fefefe
| 207035 ||  || — || November 19, 2004 || Kitt Peak || Spacewatch || — || align=right data-sort-value="0.78" | 780 m || 
|-id=036 bgcolor=#fefefe
| 207036 ||  || — || December 2, 2004 || Catalina || CSS || FLO || align=right | 1.1 km || 
|-id=037 bgcolor=#fefefe
| 207037 ||  || — || December 9, 2004 || Catalina || CSS || — || align=right | 1.3 km || 
|-id=038 bgcolor=#fefefe
| 207038 ||  || — || December 2, 2004 || Palomar || NEAT || NYS || align=right data-sort-value="0.96" | 960 m || 
|-id=039 bgcolor=#E9E9E9
| 207039 ||  || — || December 2, 2004 || Socorro || LINEAR || HNS || align=right | 3.0 km || 
|-id=040 bgcolor=#fefefe
| 207040 ||  || — || December 3, 2004 || Kitt Peak || Spacewatch || — || align=right | 1.4 km || 
|-id=041 bgcolor=#fefefe
| 207041 ||  || — || December 7, 2004 || Socorro || LINEAR || — || align=right | 1.4 km || 
|-id=042 bgcolor=#fefefe
| 207042 ||  || — || December 9, 2004 || Catalina || CSS || NYS || align=right data-sort-value="0.97" | 970 m || 
|-id=043 bgcolor=#fefefe
| 207043 ||  || — || December 9, 2004 || Catalina || CSS || NYS || align=right data-sort-value="0.85" | 850 m || 
|-id=044 bgcolor=#fefefe
| 207044 ||  || — || December 10, 2004 || Socorro || LINEAR || NYS || align=right data-sort-value="0.96" | 960 m || 
|-id=045 bgcolor=#fefefe
| 207045 ||  || — || December 8, 2004 || Socorro || LINEAR || MAS || align=right data-sort-value="0.90" | 900 m || 
|-id=046 bgcolor=#E9E9E9
| 207046 ||  || — || December 9, 2004 || Catalina || CSS || — || align=right | 1.8 km || 
|-id=047 bgcolor=#fefefe
| 207047 ||  || — || December 10, 2004 || Jarnac || Jarnac Obs. || NYS || align=right | 1.1 km || 
|-id=048 bgcolor=#fefefe
| 207048 ||  || — || December 10, 2004 || Socorro || LINEAR || MAS || align=right data-sort-value="0.88" | 880 m || 
|-id=049 bgcolor=#E9E9E9
| 207049 ||  || — || December 13, 2004 || Campo Imperatore || CINEOS || WIT || align=right | 1.5 km || 
|-id=050 bgcolor=#fefefe
| 207050 ||  || — || December 14, 2004 || Campo Imperatore || CINEOS || V || align=right | 1.2 km || 
|-id=051 bgcolor=#fefefe
| 207051 ||  || — || December 14, 2004 || Campo Imperatore || CINEOS || — || align=right | 2.2 km || 
|-id=052 bgcolor=#fefefe
| 207052 ||  || — || December 10, 2004 || Kitt Peak || Spacewatch || V || align=right data-sort-value="0.95" | 950 m || 
|-id=053 bgcolor=#fefefe
| 207053 ||  || — || December 10, 2004 || Kitt Peak || Spacewatch || V || align=right | 1.2 km || 
|-id=054 bgcolor=#E9E9E9
| 207054 ||  || — || December 12, 2004 || Anderson Mesa || LONEOS || — || align=right | 3.0 km || 
|-id=055 bgcolor=#fefefe
| 207055 ||  || — || December 2, 2004 || Kitt Peak || Spacewatch || V || align=right | 1.1 km || 
|-id=056 bgcolor=#fefefe
| 207056 ||  || — || December 3, 2004 || Kitt Peak || Spacewatch || NYS || align=right | 1.1 km || 
|-id=057 bgcolor=#fefefe
| 207057 ||  || — || December 8, 2004 || Socorro || LINEAR || — || align=right | 1.5 km || 
|-id=058 bgcolor=#E9E9E9
| 207058 ||  || — || December 8, 2004 || Socorro || LINEAR || — || align=right | 1.8 km || 
|-id=059 bgcolor=#fefefe
| 207059 ||  || — || December 10, 2004 || Socorro || LINEAR || MAS || align=right | 1.3 km || 
|-id=060 bgcolor=#fefefe
| 207060 ||  || — || December 11, 2004 || Kitt Peak || Spacewatch || V || align=right | 1.0 km || 
|-id=061 bgcolor=#fefefe
| 207061 ||  || — || December 11, 2004 || Kitt Peak || Spacewatch || V || align=right | 1.1 km || 
|-id=062 bgcolor=#fefefe
| 207062 ||  || — || December 13, 2004 || Kitt Peak || Spacewatch || NYS || align=right data-sort-value="0.88" | 880 m || 
|-id=063 bgcolor=#E9E9E9
| 207063 ||  || — || December 11, 2004 || Kitt Peak || Spacewatch || — || align=right | 1.6 km || 
|-id=064 bgcolor=#fefefe
| 207064 ||  || — || December 12, 2004 || Kitt Peak || Spacewatch || MAS || align=right | 1.0 km || 
|-id=065 bgcolor=#E9E9E9
| 207065 ||  || — || December 9, 2004 || Catalina || CSS || HNS || align=right | 1.8 km || 
|-id=066 bgcolor=#fefefe
| 207066 ||  || — || December 10, 2004 || Kitt Peak || Spacewatch || NYS || align=right | 1.1 km || 
|-id=067 bgcolor=#fefefe
| 207067 ||  || — || December 13, 2004 || Anderson Mesa || LONEOS || — || align=right | 1.6 km || 
|-id=068 bgcolor=#fefefe
| 207068 ||  || — || December 14, 2004 || Socorro || LINEAR || — || align=right | 1.4 km || 
|-id=069 bgcolor=#fefefe
| 207069 ||  || — || December 10, 2004 || Kitt Peak || Spacewatch || — || align=right | 1.2 km || 
|-id=070 bgcolor=#E9E9E9
| 207070 ||  || — || December 10, 2004 || Kitt Peak || Spacewatch || — || align=right | 1.2 km || 
|-id=071 bgcolor=#fefefe
| 207071 ||  || — || December 12, 2004 || Kitt Peak || Spacewatch || MAS || align=right | 1.3 km || 
|-id=072 bgcolor=#E9E9E9
| 207072 ||  || — || December 14, 2004 || Socorro || LINEAR || — || align=right | 3.0 km || 
|-id=073 bgcolor=#fefefe
| 207073 ||  || — || December 13, 2004 || Socorro || LINEAR || — || align=right | 1.7 km || 
|-id=074 bgcolor=#fefefe
| 207074 ||  || — || December 14, 2004 || Socorro || LINEAR || — || align=right | 1.2 km || 
|-id=075 bgcolor=#E9E9E9
| 207075 ||  || — || December 11, 2004 || Kitt Peak || Spacewatch || NEM || align=right | 3.1 km || 
|-id=076 bgcolor=#fefefe
| 207076 ||  || — || December 14, 2004 || Socorro || LINEAR || V || align=right | 1.1 km || 
|-id=077 bgcolor=#fefefe
| 207077 ||  || — || December 13, 2004 || Kitt Peak || Spacewatch || NYS || align=right data-sort-value="0.91" | 910 m || 
|-id=078 bgcolor=#fefefe
| 207078 ||  || — || December 14, 2004 || Socorro || LINEAR || MAS || align=right | 1.2 km || 
|-id=079 bgcolor=#fefefe
| 207079 ||  || — || December 9, 2004 || Kitt Peak || Spacewatch || — || align=right | 1.2 km || 
|-id=080 bgcolor=#E9E9E9
| 207080 ||  || — || December 13, 2004 || Kitt Peak || Spacewatch || ADE || align=right | 4.3 km || 
|-id=081 bgcolor=#fefefe
| 207081 ||  || — || December 14, 2004 || Catalina || CSS || — || align=right | 1.0 km || 
|-id=082 bgcolor=#fefefe
| 207082 ||  || — || December 14, 2004 || Kitt Peak || Spacewatch || — || align=right | 1.2 km || 
|-id=083 bgcolor=#fefefe
| 207083 ||  || — || December 3, 2004 || Anderson Mesa || LONEOS || V || align=right data-sort-value="0.97" | 970 m || 
|-id=084 bgcolor=#fefefe
| 207084 ||  || — || December 2, 2004 || Catalina || CSS || — || align=right | 1.5 km || 
|-id=085 bgcolor=#fefefe
| 207085 ||  || — || December 2, 2004 || Kitt Peak || Spacewatch || — || align=right | 1.0 km || 
|-id=086 bgcolor=#fefefe
| 207086 ||  || — || December 10, 2004 || Kitt Peak || Spacewatch || — || align=right | 1.2 km || 
|-id=087 bgcolor=#fefefe
| 207087 ||  || — || December 18, 2004 || Mount Lemmon || Mount Lemmon Survey || NYS || align=right data-sort-value="0.95" | 950 m || 
|-id=088 bgcolor=#fefefe
| 207088 ||  || — || December 18, 2004 || Mount Lemmon || Mount Lemmon Survey || NYS || align=right | 1.1 km || 
|-id=089 bgcolor=#fefefe
| 207089 ||  || — || December 18, 2004 || Mount Lemmon || Mount Lemmon Survey || NYS || align=right | 1.0 km || 
|-id=090 bgcolor=#E9E9E9
| 207090 ||  || — || December 18, 2004 || Mount Lemmon || Mount Lemmon Survey || — || align=right data-sort-value="0.91" | 910 m || 
|-id=091 bgcolor=#fefefe
| 207091 ||  || — || January 1, 2005 || Catalina || CSS || NYS || align=right | 1.2 km || 
|-id=092 bgcolor=#E9E9E9
| 207092 ||  || — || January 6, 2005 || Catalina || CSS || — || align=right | 1.5 km || 
|-id=093 bgcolor=#fefefe
| 207093 ||  || — || January 6, 2005 || Catalina || CSS || — || align=right | 1.2 km || 
|-id=094 bgcolor=#fefefe
| 207094 ||  || — || January 6, 2005 || Catalina || CSS || — || align=right | 3.5 km || 
|-id=095 bgcolor=#E9E9E9
| 207095 ||  || — || January 6, 2005 || Catalina || CSS || — || align=right | 1.3 km || 
|-id=096 bgcolor=#fefefe
| 207096 ||  || — || January 6, 2005 || Catalina || CSS || V || align=right | 1.1 km || 
|-id=097 bgcolor=#fefefe
| 207097 ||  || — || January 6, 2005 || Catalina || CSS || — || align=right | 1.4 km || 
|-id=098 bgcolor=#fefefe
| 207098 ||  || — || January 6, 2005 || Catalina || CSS || V || align=right | 1.3 km || 
|-id=099 bgcolor=#E9E9E9
| 207099 ||  || — || January 6, 2005 || Catalina || CSS || — || align=right | 2.5 km || 
|-id=100 bgcolor=#E9E9E9
| 207100 ||  || — || January 1, 2005 || Catalina || CSS || — || align=right | 3.6 km || 
|}

207101–207200 

|-bgcolor=#fefefe
| 207101 ||  || — || January 1, 2005 || Catalina || CSS || — || align=right | 1.4 km || 
|-id=102 bgcolor=#fefefe
| 207102 ||  || — || January 6, 2005 || Socorro || LINEAR || V || align=right data-sort-value="0.96" | 960 m || 
|-id=103 bgcolor=#fefefe
| 207103 ||  || — || January 7, 2005 || Socorro || LINEAR || NYS || align=right data-sort-value="0.95" | 950 m || 
|-id=104 bgcolor=#E9E9E9
| 207104 ||  || — || January 7, 2005 || Socorro || LINEAR || EUN || align=right | 2.3 km || 
|-id=105 bgcolor=#fefefe
| 207105 ||  || — || January 7, 2005 || Catalina || CSS || — || align=right | 3.0 km || 
|-id=106 bgcolor=#E9E9E9
| 207106 ||  || — || January 7, 2005 || Catalina || CSS || — || align=right | 1.6 km || 
|-id=107 bgcolor=#E9E9E9
| 207107 ||  || — || January 7, 2005 || Catalina || CSS || KON || align=right | 4.5 km || 
|-id=108 bgcolor=#E9E9E9
| 207108 ||  || — || January 13, 2005 || Kitt Peak || Spacewatch || — || align=right | 1.3 km || 
|-id=109 bgcolor=#fefefe
| 207109 Stürmenchopf ||  ||  || January 11, 2005 || Vicques || M. Ory || — || align=right | 1.3 km || 
|-id=110 bgcolor=#fefefe
| 207110 ||  || — || January 8, 2005 || Campo Imperatore || CINEOS || MAS || align=right | 1.3 km || 
|-id=111 bgcolor=#fefefe
| 207111 ||  || — || January 9, 2005 || Junk Bond || Junk Bond Obs. || NYS || align=right | 1.0 km || 
|-id=112 bgcolor=#fefefe
| 207112 ||  || — || January 13, 2005 || Kitt Peak || Spacewatch || NYS || align=right data-sort-value="0.83" | 830 m || 
|-id=113 bgcolor=#fefefe
| 207113 ||  || — || January 13, 2005 || Kitt Peak || Spacewatch || NYS || align=right | 1.0 km || 
|-id=114 bgcolor=#fefefe
| 207114 ||  || — || January 13, 2005 || Socorro || LINEAR || NYS || align=right | 1.0 km || 
|-id=115 bgcolor=#E9E9E9
| 207115 ||  || — || January 13, 2005 || Socorro || LINEAR || — || align=right | 3.4 km || 
|-id=116 bgcolor=#fefefe
| 207116 ||  || — || January 15, 2005 || Socorro || LINEAR || MAS || align=right | 1.1 km || 
|-id=117 bgcolor=#fefefe
| 207117 ||  || — || January 15, 2005 || Socorro || LINEAR || NYS || align=right data-sort-value="0.87" | 870 m || 
|-id=118 bgcolor=#E9E9E9
| 207118 ||  || — || January 13, 2005 || Kitt Peak || Spacewatch || — || align=right | 1.8 km || 
|-id=119 bgcolor=#E9E9E9
| 207119 ||  || — || January 13, 2005 || Catalina || CSS || MAR || align=right | 1.6 km || 
|-id=120 bgcolor=#fefefe
| 207120 ||  || — || January 15, 2005 || Socorro || LINEAR || NYS || align=right | 1.3 km || 
|-id=121 bgcolor=#E9E9E9
| 207121 ||  || — || January 15, 2005 || Socorro || LINEAR || — || align=right | 1.4 km || 
|-id=122 bgcolor=#fefefe
| 207122 ||  || — || January 15, 2005 || Socorro || LINEAR || NYS || align=right data-sort-value="0.97" | 970 m || 
|-id=123 bgcolor=#E9E9E9
| 207123 ||  || — || January 15, 2005 || Kitt Peak || Spacewatch || — || align=right | 3.6 km || 
|-id=124 bgcolor=#E9E9E9
| 207124 ||  || — || January 15, 2005 || Kitt Peak || Spacewatch || MAR || align=right | 1.9 km || 
|-id=125 bgcolor=#E9E9E9
| 207125 ||  || — || January 13, 2005 || Kitt Peak || Spacewatch || — || align=right | 1.8 km || 
|-id=126 bgcolor=#d6d6d6
| 207126 ||  || — || January 15, 2005 || Catalina || CSS || 615 || align=right | 2.1 km || 
|-id=127 bgcolor=#fefefe
| 207127 ||  || — || January 15, 2005 || Socorro || LINEAR || MAS || align=right | 1.2 km || 
|-id=128 bgcolor=#fefefe
| 207128 ||  || — || January 15, 2005 || Kitt Peak || Spacewatch || MAS || align=right | 1.1 km || 
|-id=129 bgcolor=#E9E9E9
| 207129 ||  || — || January 15, 2005 || Kitt Peak || Spacewatch || — || align=right | 1.6 km || 
|-id=130 bgcolor=#E9E9E9
| 207130 || 2005 BW || — || January 16, 2005 || Jonathan B. Postel || Jonathan B. Postel Obs. || — || align=right | 1.4 km || 
|-id=131 bgcolor=#fefefe
| 207131 ||  || — || January 16, 2005 || Socorro || LINEAR || — || align=right | 2.7 km || 
|-id=132 bgcolor=#fefefe
| 207132 ||  || — || January 16, 2005 || Socorro || LINEAR || — || align=right | 1.6 km || 
|-id=133 bgcolor=#fefefe
| 207133 ||  || — || January 16, 2005 || Socorro || LINEAR || NYS || align=right | 1.2 km || 
|-id=134 bgcolor=#fefefe
| 207134 ||  || — || January 16, 2005 || Socorro || LINEAR || SUL || align=right | 3.0 km || 
|-id=135 bgcolor=#fefefe
| 207135 ||  || — || January 16, 2005 || Socorro || LINEAR || NYS || align=right | 1.2 km || 
|-id=136 bgcolor=#E9E9E9
| 207136 ||  || — || January 16, 2005 || Kitt Peak || Spacewatch || — || align=right | 2.5 km || 
|-id=137 bgcolor=#fefefe
| 207137 ||  || — || January 16, 2005 || Socorro || LINEAR || NYS || align=right | 1.2 km || 
|-id=138 bgcolor=#fefefe
| 207138 ||  || — || January 16, 2005 || Kitt Peak || Spacewatch || NYS || align=right | 1.0 km || 
|-id=139 bgcolor=#E9E9E9
| 207139 ||  || — || January 16, 2005 || Socorro || LINEAR || MAR || align=right | 1.6 km || 
|-id=140 bgcolor=#fefefe
| 207140 ||  || — || January 17, 2005 || Socorro || LINEAR || MAS || align=right | 1.0 km || 
|-id=141 bgcolor=#E9E9E9
| 207141 ||  || — || January 17, 2005 || Goodricke-Pigott || Goodricke-Pigott Obs. || — || align=right | 1.7 km || 
|-id=142 bgcolor=#fefefe
| 207142 ||  || — || January 18, 2005 || Kitt Peak || Spacewatch || — || align=right | 2.1 km || 
|-id=143 bgcolor=#E9E9E9
| 207143 ||  || — || February 1, 2005 || Kitt Peak || Spacewatch || — || align=right | 2.4 km || 
|-id=144 bgcolor=#fefefe
| 207144 ||  || — || February 2, 2005 || Kitt Peak || Spacewatch || V || align=right data-sort-value="0.95" | 950 m || 
|-id=145 bgcolor=#E9E9E9
| 207145 ||  || — || February 2, 2005 || Kitt Peak || Spacewatch || KON || align=right | 3.0 km || 
|-id=146 bgcolor=#E9E9E9
| 207146 ||  || — || February 2, 2005 || Kitt Peak || Spacewatch || — || align=right | 1.2 km || 
|-id=147 bgcolor=#E9E9E9
| 207147 ||  || — || February 2, 2005 || Socorro || LINEAR || — || align=right | 1.7 km || 
|-id=148 bgcolor=#E9E9E9
| 207148 ||  || — || February 2, 2005 || Socorro || LINEAR || — || align=right | 1.2 km || 
|-id=149 bgcolor=#E9E9E9
| 207149 ||  || — || February 2, 2005 || Catalina || CSS || — || align=right | 1.1 km || 
|-id=150 bgcolor=#E9E9E9
| 207150 ||  || — || February 2, 2005 || Catalina || CSS || — || align=right | 1.3 km || 
|-id=151 bgcolor=#fefefe
| 207151 ||  || — || February 2, 2005 || Catalina || CSS || — || align=right | 1.3 km || 
|-id=152 bgcolor=#E9E9E9
| 207152 ||  || — || February 2, 2005 || Palomar || NEAT || — || align=right | 2.0 km || 
|-id=153 bgcolor=#E9E9E9
| 207153 ||  || — || February 4, 2005 || Palomar || NEAT || — || align=right | 2.0 km || 
|-id=154 bgcolor=#fefefe
| 207154 ||  || — || February 2, 2005 || Catalina || CSS || MAS || align=right | 1.1 km || 
|-id=155 bgcolor=#E9E9E9
| 207155 ||  || — || February 1, 2005 || Kitt Peak || Spacewatch || MAR || align=right | 2.4 km || 
|-id=156 bgcolor=#E9E9E9
| 207156 ||  || — || February 1, 2005 || Kitt Peak || Spacewatch || — || align=right | 1.4 km || 
|-id=157 bgcolor=#fefefe
| 207157 ||  || — || February 1, 2005 || Kitt Peak || Spacewatch || — || align=right | 1.1 km || 
|-id=158 bgcolor=#fefefe
| 207158 ||  || — || February 2, 2005 || Kitt Peak || Spacewatch || NYS || align=right data-sort-value="0.99" | 990 m || 
|-id=159 bgcolor=#fefefe
| 207159 ||  || — || February 3, 2005 || Socorro || LINEAR || — || align=right | 1.5 km || 
|-id=160 bgcolor=#E9E9E9
| 207160 ||  || — || February 3, 2005 || Socorro || LINEAR || MIT || align=right | 4.4 km || 
|-id=161 bgcolor=#fefefe
| 207161 ||  || — || February 2, 2005 || Catalina || CSS || NYS || align=right | 1.2 km || 
|-id=162 bgcolor=#E9E9E9
| 207162 ||  || — || February 2, 2005 || Kitt Peak || Spacewatch || — || align=right data-sort-value="0.98" | 980 m || 
|-id=163 bgcolor=#E9E9E9
| 207163 ||  || — || February 2, 2005 || Kitt Peak || Spacewatch || — || align=right | 1.6 km || 
|-id=164 bgcolor=#fefefe
| 207164 ||  || — || February 2, 2005 || Kitt Peak || Spacewatch || — || align=right | 1.1 km || 
|-id=165 bgcolor=#E9E9E9
| 207165 ||  || — || February 2, 2005 || Kitt Peak || Spacewatch || — || align=right | 1.4 km || 
|-id=166 bgcolor=#d6d6d6
| 207166 ||  || — || February 2, 2005 || Socorro || LINEAR || — || align=right | 2.8 km || 
|-id=167 bgcolor=#E9E9E9
| 207167 ||  || — || February 3, 2005 || Socorro || LINEAR || — || align=right | 3.7 km || 
|-id=168 bgcolor=#E9E9E9
| 207168 ||  || — || February 3, 2005 || Socorro || LINEAR || — || align=right | 2.5 km || 
|-id=169 bgcolor=#fefefe
| 207169 ||  || — || February 9, 2005 || Mount Lemmon || Mount Lemmon Survey || — || align=right | 1.2 km || 
|-id=170 bgcolor=#E9E9E9
| 207170 ||  || — || February 2, 2005 || Catalina || CSS || — || align=right | 2.9 km || 
|-id=171 bgcolor=#E9E9E9
| 207171 ||  || — || February 2, 2005 || Socorro || LINEAR || — || align=right | 2.0 km || 
|-id=172 bgcolor=#fefefe
| 207172 ||  || — || February 9, 2005 || Kitt Peak || Spacewatch || — || align=right | 1.3 km || 
|-id=173 bgcolor=#E9E9E9
| 207173 ||  || — || February 9, 2005 || Kitt Peak || Spacewatch || — || align=right | 1.7 km || 
|-id=174 bgcolor=#E9E9E9
| 207174 ||  || — || February 15, 2005 || Gnosca || S. Sposetti || AER || align=right | 1.8 km || 
|-id=175 bgcolor=#fefefe
| 207175 ||  || — || February 15, 2005 || Gnosca || S. Sposetti || NYS || align=right data-sort-value="0.93" | 930 m || 
|-id=176 bgcolor=#fefefe
| 207176 ||  || — || February 2, 2005 || Kitt Peak || Spacewatch || — || align=right | 1.2 km || 
|-id=177 bgcolor=#E9E9E9
| 207177 ||  || — || February 3, 2005 || Socorro || LINEAR || — || align=right | 3.3 km || 
|-id=178 bgcolor=#E9E9E9
| 207178 ||  || — || February 3, 2005 || Socorro || LINEAR || — || align=right | 1.9 km || 
|-id=179 bgcolor=#E9E9E9
| 207179 ||  || — || February 14, 2005 || Socorro || LINEAR || — || align=right | 2.6 km || 
|-id=180 bgcolor=#E9E9E9
| 207180 || 2005 EU || — || March 2, 2005 || RAS || A. Lowe || MAR || align=right | 1.6 km || 
|-id=181 bgcolor=#E9E9E9
| 207181 ||  || — || March 1, 2005 || Kitt Peak || Spacewatch || — || align=right | 1.9 km || 
|-id=182 bgcolor=#E9E9E9
| 207182 ||  || — || March 2, 2005 || Kitt Peak || Spacewatch || — || align=right | 1.2 km || 
|-id=183 bgcolor=#E9E9E9
| 207183 ||  || — || March 2, 2005 || Catalina || CSS || — || align=right | 2.0 km || 
|-id=184 bgcolor=#E9E9E9
| 207184 ||  || — || March 3, 2005 || Kitt Peak || Spacewatch || — || align=right | 2.8 km || 
|-id=185 bgcolor=#E9E9E9
| 207185 ||  || — || March 3, 2005 || Kitt Peak || Spacewatch || — || align=right | 1.2 km || 
|-id=186 bgcolor=#E9E9E9
| 207186 ||  || — || March 3, 2005 || Kitt Peak || Spacewatch || — || align=right | 1.2 km || 
|-id=187 bgcolor=#E9E9E9
| 207187 ||  || — || March 3, 2005 || Catalina || CSS || — || align=right | 2.7 km || 
|-id=188 bgcolor=#d6d6d6
| 207188 ||  || — || March 3, 2005 || Catalina || CSS || — || align=right | 3.5 km || 
|-id=189 bgcolor=#E9E9E9
| 207189 ||  || — || March 3, 2005 || Catalina || CSS || — || align=right | 3.4 km || 
|-id=190 bgcolor=#E9E9E9
| 207190 ||  || — || March 1, 2005 || Kitt Peak || Spacewatch || — || align=right | 2.1 km || 
|-id=191 bgcolor=#fefefe
| 207191 ||  || — || March 3, 2005 || Kitt Peak || Spacewatch || — || align=right | 1.7 km || 
|-id=192 bgcolor=#E9E9E9
| 207192 ||  || — || March 4, 2005 || Kitt Peak || Spacewatch || — || align=right | 3.0 km || 
|-id=193 bgcolor=#E9E9E9
| 207193 ||  || — || March 3, 2005 || Goodricke-Pigott || R. A. Tucker || — || align=right | 1.8 km || 
|-id=194 bgcolor=#E9E9E9
| 207194 ||  || — || March 3, 2005 || Kitt Peak || Spacewatch || — || align=right | 1.6 km || 
|-id=195 bgcolor=#E9E9E9
| 207195 ||  || — || March 3, 2005 || Kitt Peak || Spacewatch || — || align=right | 2.9 km || 
|-id=196 bgcolor=#E9E9E9
| 207196 ||  || — || March 3, 2005 || Catalina || CSS || MAR || align=right | 1.5 km || 
|-id=197 bgcolor=#E9E9E9
| 207197 ||  || — || March 3, 2005 || Catalina || CSS || — || align=right | 2.3 km || 
|-id=198 bgcolor=#E9E9E9
| 207198 ||  || — || March 3, 2005 || Catalina || CSS || — || align=right | 1.9 km || 
|-id=199 bgcolor=#E9E9E9
| 207199 ||  || — || March 3, 2005 || Catalina || CSS || — || align=right | 3.9 km || 
|-id=200 bgcolor=#E9E9E9
| 207200 ||  || — || March 3, 2005 || Catalina || CSS || — || align=right | 2.0 km || 
|}

207201–207300 

|-bgcolor=#E9E9E9
| 207201 ||  || — || March 4, 2005 || Kitt Peak || Spacewatch || — || align=right | 1.2 km || 
|-id=202 bgcolor=#E9E9E9
| 207202 ||  || — || March 4, 2005 || Kitt Peak || Spacewatch || — || align=right | 2.4 km || 
|-id=203 bgcolor=#E9E9E9
| 207203 ||  || — || March 4, 2005 || Mount Lemmon || Mount Lemmon Survey || — || align=right | 2.1 km || 
|-id=204 bgcolor=#E9E9E9
| 207204 ||  || — || March 4, 2005 || Socorro || LINEAR || — || align=right | 2.3 km || 
|-id=205 bgcolor=#E9E9E9
| 207205 ||  || — || March 4, 2005 || Catalina || CSS || — || align=right | 2.0 km || 
|-id=206 bgcolor=#E9E9E9
| 207206 ||  || — || March 4, 2005 || Catalina || CSS || — || align=right | 2.5 km || 
|-id=207 bgcolor=#E9E9E9
| 207207 ||  || — || March 4, 2005 || Catalina || CSS || — || align=right | 3.3 km || 
|-id=208 bgcolor=#fefefe
| 207208 ||  || — || March 2, 2005 || Catalina || CSS || — || align=right | 3.9 km || 
|-id=209 bgcolor=#E9E9E9
| 207209 ||  || — || March 2, 2005 || Catalina || CSS || — || align=right | 1.2 km || 
|-id=210 bgcolor=#E9E9E9
| 207210 ||  || — || March 3, 2005 || Kitt Peak || Spacewatch || HEN || align=right | 1.4 km || 
|-id=211 bgcolor=#E9E9E9
| 207211 ||  || — || March 3, 2005 || Kitt Peak || Spacewatch || AEO || align=right | 1.7 km || 
|-id=212 bgcolor=#E9E9E9
| 207212 ||  || — || March 3, 2005 || Kitt Peak || Spacewatch || — || align=right | 1.1 km || 
|-id=213 bgcolor=#E9E9E9
| 207213 ||  || — || March 3, 2005 || Kitt Peak || Spacewatch || — || align=right | 1.9 km || 
|-id=214 bgcolor=#E9E9E9
| 207214 ||  || — || March 3, 2005 || Catalina || CSS || — || align=right | 1.7 km || 
|-id=215 bgcolor=#E9E9E9
| 207215 ||  || — || March 4, 2005 || Kitt Peak || Spacewatch || — || align=right | 2.1 km || 
|-id=216 bgcolor=#E9E9E9
| 207216 ||  || — || March 4, 2005 || Socorro || LINEAR || — || align=right | 3.3 km || 
|-id=217 bgcolor=#E9E9E9
| 207217 ||  || — || March 4, 2005 || Mount Lemmon || Mount Lemmon Survey || NEM || align=right | 3.5 km || 
|-id=218 bgcolor=#E9E9E9
| 207218 ||  || — || March 8, 2005 || Kitt Peak || Spacewatch || — || align=right | 2.8 km || 
|-id=219 bgcolor=#E9E9E9
| 207219 ||  || — || March 8, 2005 || Socorro || LINEAR || MAR || align=right | 2.6 km || 
|-id=220 bgcolor=#E9E9E9
| 207220 ||  || — || March 3, 2005 || Catalina || CSS || — || align=right | 1.5 km || 
|-id=221 bgcolor=#E9E9E9
| 207221 ||  || — || March 4, 2005 || Socorro || LINEAR || JUN || align=right | 1.7 km || 
|-id=222 bgcolor=#E9E9E9
| 207222 ||  || — || March 4, 2005 || Socorro || LINEAR || NEM || align=right | 3.5 km || 
|-id=223 bgcolor=#E9E9E9
| 207223 ||  || — || March 4, 2005 || Mount Lemmon || Mount Lemmon Survey || NEM || align=right | 2.9 km || 
|-id=224 bgcolor=#E9E9E9
| 207224 ||  || — || March 9, 2005 || Mount Lemmon || Mount Lemmon Survey || — || align=right | 2.1 km || 
|-id=225 bgcolor=#E9E9E9
| 207225 ||  || — || March 9, 2005 || Anderson Mesa || LONEOS || — || align=right | 3.1 km || 
|-id=226 bgcolor=#E9E9E9
| 207226 ||  || — || March 10, 2005 || Mount Lemmon || Mount Lemmon Survey || — || align=right | 2.3 km || 
|-id=227 bgcolor=#d6d6d6
| 207227 ||  || — || March 10, 2005 || Mount Lemmon || Mount Lemmon Survey || — || align=right | 3.1 km || 
|-id=228 bgcolor=#E9E9E9
| 207228 ||  || — || March 10, 2005 || Kitt Peak || Spacewatch || — || align=right | 3.4 km || 
|-id=229 bgcolor=#E9E9E9
| 207229 ||  || — || March 8, 2005 || Mount Lemmon || Mount Lemmon Survey || — || align=right | 3.4 km || 
|-id=230 bgcolor=#E9E9E9
| 207230 ||  || — || March 8, 2005 || Mount Lemmon || Mount Lemmon Survey || — || align=right | 4.2 km || 
|-id=231 bgcolor=#d6d6d6
| 207231 ||  || — || March 8, 2005 || Mount Lemmon || Mount Lemmon Survey || — || align=right | 3.7 km || 
|-id=232 bgcolor=#E9E9E9
| 207232 ||  || — || March 9, 2005 || Catalina || CSS || — || align=right | 1.6 km || 
|-id=233 bgcolor=#E9E9E9
| 207233 ||  || — || March 9, 2005 || Mount Lemmon || Mount Lemmon Survey || — || align=right | 2.1 km || 
|-id=234 bgcolor=#E9E9E9
| 207234 ||  || — || March 9, 2005 || Mount Lemmon || Mount Lemmon Survey || HOF || align=right | 3.7 km || 
|-id=235 bgcolor=#E9E9E9
| 207235 ||  || — || March 10, 2005 || Mount Lemmon || Mount Lemmon Survey || — || align=right | 2.9 km || 
|-id=236 bgcolor=#E9E9E9
| 207236 ||  || — || March 10, 2005 || Mount Lemmon || Mount Lemmon Survey || — || align=right | 1.7 km || 
|-id=237 bgcolor=#E9E9E9
| 207237 ||  || — || March 11, 2005 || Mount Lemmon || Mount Lemmon Survey || — || align=right | 4.0 km || 
|-id=238 bgcolor=#d6d6d6
| 207238 ||  || — || March 11, 2005 || Mount Lemmon || Mount Lemmon Survey || — || align=right | 3.1 km || 
|-id=239 bgcolor=#E9E9E9
| 207239 ||  || — || March 11, 2005 || Mount Lemmon || Mount Lemmon Survey || — || align=right | 1.9 km || 
|-id=240 bgcolor=#E9E9E9
| 207240 ||  || — || March 11, 2005 || Catalina || CSS || JUN || align=right | 1.9 km || 
|-id=241 bgcolor=#E9E9E9
| 207241 ||  || — || March 8, 2005 || Anderson Mesa || LONEOS || — || align=right | 4.3 km || 
|-id=242 bgcolor=#E9E9E9
| 207242 ||  || — || March 9, 2005 || Kitt Peak || Spacewatch || — || align=right | 2.0 km || 
|-id=243 bgcolor=#E9E9E9
| 207243 ||  || — || March 9, 2005 || Mount Lemmon || Mount Lemmon Survey || HOF || align=right | 3.0 km || 
|-id=244 bgcolor=#E9E9E9
| 207244 ||  || — || March 9, 2005 || Mount Lemmon || Mount Lemmon Survey || MIS || align=right | 3.7 km || 
|-id=245 bgcolor=#E9E9E9
| 207245 ||  || — || March 11, 2005 || Mount Lemmon || Mount Lemmon Survey || MIS || align=right | 3.1 km || 
|-id=246 bgcolor=#E9E9E9
| 207246 ||  || — || March 4, 2005 || Socorro || LINEAR || HNS || align=right | 1.6 km || 
|-id=247 bgcolor=#d6d6d6
| 207247 ||  || — || March 4, 2005 || Socorro || LINEAR || — || align=right | 3.5 km || 
|-id=248 bgcolor=#E9E9E9
| 207248 ||  || — || March 4, 2005 || Mount Lemmon || Mount Lemmon Survey || HEN || align=right | 1.2 km || 
|-id=249 bgcolor=#E9E9E9
| 207249 ||  || — || March 9, 2005 || Socorro || LINEAR || NEM || align=right | 3.0 km || 
|-id=250 bgcolor=#E9E9E9
| 207250 ||  || — || March 9, 2005 || Anderson Mesa || LONEOS || — || align=right | 2.1 km || 
|-id=251 bgcolor=#E9E9E9
| 207251 ||  || — || March 4, 2005 || Socorro || LINEAR || — || align=right | 1.2 km || 
|-id=252 bgcolor=#E9E9E9
| 207252 ||  || — || March 10, 2005 || Mount Lemmon || Mount Lemmon Survey || — || align=right | 1.8 km || 
|-id=253 bgcolor=#E9E9E9
| 207253 ||  || — || March 10, 2005 || Anderson Mesa || LONEOS || MIT || align=right | 2.8 km || 
|-id=254 bgcolor=#E9E9E9
| 207254 ||  || — || March 11, 2005 || Catalina || CSS || EUN || align=right | 2.4 km || 
|-id=255 bgcolor=#E9E9E9
| 207255 ||  || — || March 11, 2005 || Catalina || CSS || — || align=right | 3.5 km || 
|-id=256 bgcolor=#E9E9E9
| 207256 ||  || — || March 12, 2005 || Kitt Peak || Spacewatch || — || align=right | 1.9 km || 
|-id=257 bgcolor=#E9E9E9
| 207257 ||  || — || March 12, 2005 || Kitt Peak || Spacewatch || — || align=right | 1.6 km || 
|-id=258 bgcolor=#E9E9E9
| 207258 ||  || — || March 9, 2005 || Socorro || LINEAR || — || align=right | 1.5 km || 
|-id=259 bgcolor=#E9E9E9
| 207259 ||  || — || March 10, 2005 || Catalina || CSS || — || align=right | 1.7 km || 
|-id=260 bgcolor=#E9E9E9
| 207260 ||  || — || March 10, 2005 || Catalina || CSS || HNS || align=right | 1.8 km || 
|-id=261 bgcolor=#E9E9E9
| 207261 ||  || — || March 11, 2005 || Kitt Peak || Spacewatch || — || align=right | 2.7 km || 
|-id=262 bgcolor=#E9E9E9
| 207262 ||  || — || March 11, 2005 || Anderson Mesa || LONEOS || MIT || align=right | 3.6 km || 
|-id=263 bgcolor=#E9E9E9
| 207263 ||  || — || March 11, 2005 || Kitt Peak || Spacewatch || — || align=right | 3.7 km || 
|-id=264 bgcolor=#E9E9E9
| 207264 ||  || — || March 13, 2005 || Kitt Peak || Spacewatch || PAD || align=right | 2.4 km || 
|-id=265 bgcolor=#E9E9E9
| 207265 ||  || — || March 1, 2005 || Kitt Peak || Spacewatch || — || align=right | 2.0 km || 
|-id=266 bgcolor=#E9E9E9
| 207266 ||  || — || March 4, 2005 || Mount Lemmon || Mount Lemmon Survey || MAR || align=right | 1.7 km || 
|-id=267 bgcolor=#E9E9E9
| 207267 ||  || — || March 10, 2005 || Catalina || CSS || — || align=right | 3.6 km || 
|-id=268 bgcolor=#E9E9E9
| 207268 ||  || — || March 10, 2005 || Anderson Mesa || LONEOS || — || align=right | 2.2 km || 
|-id=269 bgcolor=#E9E9E9
| 207269 ||  || — || March 8, 2005 || Anderson Mesa || LONEOS || — || align=right | 3.0 km || 
|-id=270 bgcolor=#E9E9E9
| 207270 ||  || — || March 10, 2005 || Catalina || CSS || — || align=right | 3.7 km || 
|-id=271 bgcolor=#E9E9E9
| 207271 ||  || — || March 8, 2005 || Mount Lemmon || Mount Lemmon Survey || NEM || align=right | 2.4 km || 
|-id=272 bgcolor=#d6d6d6
| 207272 ||  || — || March 8, 2005 || Mount Lemmon || Mount Lemmon Survey || — || align=right | 3.2 km || 
|-id=273 bgcolor=#E9E9E9
| 207273 ||  || — || March 8, 2005 || RAS || A. Lowe || — || align=right | 1.6 km || 
|-id=274 bgcolor=#E9E9E9
| 207274 ||  || — || March 10, 2005 || Catalina || CSS || — || align=right | 3.8 km || 
|-id=275 bgcolor=#E9E9E9
| 207275 ||  || — || March 14, 2005 || Mount Lemmon || Mount Lemmon Survey || — || align=right | 2.2 km || 
|-id=276 bgcolor=#E9E9E9
| 207276 ||  || — || March 1, 2005 || Catalina || CSS || — || align=right | 2.6 km || 
|-id=277 bgcolor=#E9E9E9
| 207277 ||  || — || March 31, 2005 || Anderson Mesa || LONEOS || — || align=right | 3.2 km || 
|-id=278 bgcolor=#E9E9E9
| 207278 ||  || — || March 30, 2005 || Catalina || CSS || GEF || align=right | 2.0 km || 
|-id=279 bgcolor=#E9E9E9
| 207279 ||  || — || March 30, 2005 || Catalina || CSS || — || align=right | 3.4 km || 
|-id=280 bgcolor=#E9E9E9
| 207280 ||  || — || March 30, 2005 || Catalina || CSS || INO || align=right | 2.3 km || 
|-id=281 bgcolor=#E9E9E9
| 207281 ||  || — || April 1, 2005 || Anderson Mesa || LONEOS || — || align=right | 3.1 km || 
|-id=282 bgcolor=#E9E9E9
| 207282 ||  || — || April 1, 2005 || Kitt Peak || Spacewatch || — || align=right | 2.9 km || 
|-id=283 bgcolor=#E9E9E9
| 207283 ||  || — || April 2, 2005 || Anderson Mesa || LONEOS || — || align=right | 1.9 km || 
|-id=284 bgcolor=#d6d6d6
| 207284 ||  || — || April 1, 2005 || Anderson Mesa || LONEOS || — || align=right | 3.8 km || 
|-id=285 bgcolor=#E9E9E9
| 207285 ||  || — || April 1, 2005 || Anderson Mesa || LONEOS || WIT || align=right | 1.9 km || 
|-id=286 bgcolor=#E9E9E9
| 207286 ||  || — || April 1, 2005 || Anderson Mesa || LONEOS || — || align=right | 4.7 km || 
|-id=287 bgcolor=#E9E9E9
| 207287 ||  || — || April 1, 2005 || Anderson Mesa || LONEOS || JUN || align=right | 1.7 km || 
|-id=288 bgcolor=#E9E9E9
| 207288 ||  || — || April 2, 2005 || Kitt Peak || Spacewatch || — || align=right | 2.7 km || 
|-id=289 bgcolor=#E9E9E9
| 207289 ||  || — || April 1, 2005 || Anderson Mesa || LONEOS || fast? || align=right | 4.2 km || 
|-id=290 bgcolor=#E9E9E9
| 207290 ||  || — || April 2, 2005 || Palomar || NEAT || — || align=right | 2.2 km || 
|-id=291 bgcolor=#d6d6d6
| 207291 ||  || — || April 3, 2005 || Palomar || NEAT || — || align=right | 4.3 km || 
|-id=292 bgcolor=#E9E9E9
| 207292 ||  || — || April 4, 2005 || Kitt Peak || Spacewatch || — || align=right | 3.1 km || 
|-id=293 bgcolor=#d6d6d6
| 207293 ||  || — || April 4, 2005 || Mount Lemmon || Mount Lemmon Survey || KOR || align=right | 1.7 km || 
|-id=294 bgcolor=#E9E9E9
| 207294 ||  || — || April 4, 2005 || Mount Lemmon || Mount Lemmon Survey || — || align=right | 4.2 km || 
|-id=295 bgcolor=#E9E9E9
| 207295 ||  || — || April 2, 2005 || Palomar || NEAT || EUN || align=right | 2.1 km || 
|-id=296 bgcolor=#E9E9E9
| 207296 ||  || — || April 3, 2005 || Siding Spring || SSS || — || align=right | 4.0 km || 
|-id=297 bgcolor=#E9E9E9
| 207297 ||  || — || April 4, 2005 || Catalina || CSS || HOF || align=right | 4.2 km || 
|-id=298 bgcolor=#E9E9E9
| 207298 ||  || — || April 5, 2005 || Palomar || NEAT || — || align=right | 2.2 km || 
|-id=299 bgcolor=#E9E9E9
| 207299 ||  || — || April 5, 2005 || Catalina || CSS || — || align=right | 4.0 km || 
|-id=300 bgcolor=#E9E9E9
| 207300 ||  || — || April 5, 2005 || Palomar || NEAT || — || align=right | 3.8 km || 
|}

207301–207400 

|-bgcolor=#E9E9E9
| 207301 ||  || — || April 5, 2005 || Mount Lemmon || Mount Lemmon Survey || HOF || align=right | 3.7 km || 
|-id=302 bgcolor=#E9E9E9
| 207302 ||  || — || April 1, 2005 || Anderson Mesa || LONEOS || NEM || align=right | 4.6 km || 
|-id=303 bgcolor=#E9E9E9
| 207303 ||  || — || April 2, 2005 || Mount Lemmon || Mount Lemmon Survey || — || align=right | 3.4 km || 
|-id=304 bgcolor=#E9E9E9
| 207304 ||  || — || April 6, 2005 || Mount Lemmon || Mount Lemmon Survey || HEN || align=right | 1.5 km || 
|-id=305 bgcolor=#E9E9E9
| 207305 ||  || — || April 6, 2005 || Mount Lemmon || Mount Lemmon Survey || — || align=right | 2.7 km || 
|-id=306 bgcolor=#d6d6d6
| 207306 ||  || — || April 6, 2005 || Kitt Peak || Spacewatch || CHA || align=right | 2.7 km || 
|-id=307 bgcolor=#E9E9E9
| 207307 ||  || — || April 2, 2005 || Catalina || CSS || — || align=right | 2.0 km || 
|-id=308 bgcolor=#d6d6d6
| 207308 ||  || — || April 4, 2005 || Kitt Peak || Spacewatch || KOR || align=right | 1.5 km || 
|-id=309 bgcolor=#E9E9E9
| 207309 ||  || — || April 6, 2005 || Catalina || CSS || — || align=right | 4.0 km || 
|-id=310 bgcolor=#E9E9E9
| 207310 ||  || — || April 6, 2005 || Catalina || CSS || JUN || align=right | 2.0 km || 
|-id=311 bgcolor=#d6d6d6
| 207311 ||  || — || April 7, 2005 || Anderson Mesa || LONEOS || — || align=right | 5.3 km || 
|-id=312 bgcolor=#E9E9E9
| 207312 ||  || — || April 4, 2005 || Kitt Peak || Spacewatch || — || align=right | 1.9 km || 
|-id=313 bgcolor=#E9E9E9
| 207313 ||  || — || April 6, 2005 || Mount Lemmon || Mount Lemmon Survey || — || align=right | 3.1 km || 
|-id=314 bgcolor=#E9E9E9
| 207314 ||  || — || April 6, 2005 || Kitt Peak || Spacewatch || — || align=right | 2.3 km || 
|-id=315 bgcolor=#d6d6d6
| 207315 ||  || — || April 6, 2005 || Kitt Peak || Spacewatch || THM || align=right | 4.3 km || 
|-id=316 bgcolor=#d6d6d6
| 207316 ||  || — || April 6, 2005 || Mount Lemmon || Mount Lemmon Survey || — || align=right | 4.6 km || 
|-id=317 bgcolor=#d6d6d6
| 207317 ||  || — || April 7, 2005 || Kitt Peak || Spacewatch || KOR || align=right | 1.6 km || 
|-id=318 bgcolor=#E9E9E9
| 207318 ||  || — || April 9, 2005 || Catalina || CSS || — || align=right | 2.9 km || 
|-id=319 bgcolor=#E9E9E9
| 207319 Eugenemar ||  ||  || April 10, 2005 || Mount Lemmon || A. D. Grauer || EUN || align=right | 2.1 km || 
|-id=320 bgcolor=#d6d6d6
| 207320 ||  || — || April 10, 2005 || Mount Lemmon || Mount Lemmon Survey || KOR || align=right | 1.7 km || 
|-id=321 bgcolor=#E9E9E9
| 207321 Crawshaw ||  ||  || April 10, 2005 || Mount Lemmon || A. D. Grauer || — || align=right | 3.7 km || 
|-id=322 bgcolor=#E9E9E9
| 207322 ||  || — || April 6, 2005 || Catalina || CSS || — || align=right | 3.4 km || 
|-id=323 bgcolor=#E9E9E9
| 207323 ||  || — || April 10, 2005 || Siding Spring || SSS || — || align=right | 2.4 km || 
|-id=324 bgcolor=#d6d6d6
| 207324 ||  || — || April 9, 2005 || Kitt Peak || Spacewatch || — || align=right | 3.7 km || 
|-id=325 bgcolor=#d6d6d6
| 207325 ||  || — || April 10, 2005 || Kitt Peak || Spacewatch || — || align=right | 2.8 km || 
|-id=326 bgcolor=#d6d6d6
| 207326 ||  || — || April 10, 2005 || Kitt Peak || Spacewatch || — || align=right | 4.0 km || 
|-id=327 bgcolor=#E9E9E9
| 207327 ||  || — || April 12, 2005 || Mount Lemmon || Mount Lemmon Survey || — || align=right | 1.6 km || 
|-id=328 bgcolor=#d6d6d6
| 207328 ||  || — || April 11, 2005 || Kitt Peak || Spacewatch || KOR || align=right | 1.9 km || 
|-id=329 bgcolor=#E9E9E9
| 207329 ||  || — || April 11, 2005 || Kitt Peak || Spacewatch || — || align=right | 1.4 km || 
|-id=330 bgcolor=#E9E9E9
| 207330 ||  || — || April 11, 2005 || Kitt Peak || Spacewatch || — || align=right | 2.7 km || 
|-id=331 bgcolor=#fefefe
| 207331 ||  || — || April 11, 2005 || Anderson Mesa || LONEOS || — || align=right | 1.5 km || 
|-id=332 bgcolor=#d6d6d6
| 207332 ||  || — || April 14, 2005 || Kitt Peak || Spacewatch || KOR || align=right | 1.8 km || 
|-id=333 bgcolor=#E9E9E9
| 207333 ||  || — || April 14, 2005 || Kitt Peak || Spacewatch || — || align=right | 2.8 km || 
|-id=334 bgcolor=#E9E9E9
| 207334 ||  || — || April 12, 2005 || Kitt Peak || Spacewatch || KON || align=right | 3.7 km || 
|-id=335 bgcolor=#d6d6d6
| 207335 ||  || — || April 2, 2005 || Catalina || CSS || TIR || align=right | 4.4 km || 
|-id=336 bgcolor=#d6d6d6
| 207336 ||  || — || April 4, 2005 || Kitt Peak || Spacewatch || — || align=right | 3.9 km || 
|-id=337 bgcolor=#E9E9E9
| 207337 ||  || — || April 16, 2005 || Kitt Peak || Spacewatch || — || align=right | 3.0 km || 
|-id=338 bgcolor=#E9E9E9
| 207338 ||  || — || April 17, 2005 || Kitt Peak || Spacewatch || MRX || align=right | 1.8 km || 
|-id=339 bgcolor=#E9E9E9
| 207339 ||  || — || April 19, 2005 || Catalina || CSS || — || align=right | 2.1 km || 
|-id=340 bgcolor=#E9E9E9
| 207340 ||  || — || May 3, 2005 || Kitt Peak || Spacewatch || AEO || align=right | 1.6 km || 
|-id=341 bgcolor=#d6d6d6
| 207341 Isabelmartin ||  ||  || May 3, 2005 || La Cañada || J. Lacruz || — || align=right | 2.7 km || 
|-id=342 bgcolor=#E9E9E9
| 207342 ||  || — || May 1, 2005 || Palomar || NEAT || — || align=right | 1.1 km || 
|-id=343 bgcolor=#d6d6d6
| 207343 ||  || — || May 3, 2005 || Kitt Peak || Spacewatch || — || align=right | 4.3 km || 
|-id=344 bgcolor=#E9E9E9
| 207344 ||  || — || May 3, 2005 || Socorro || LINEAR || — || align=right | 2.9 km || 
|-id=345 bgcolor=#d6d6d6
| 207345 ||  || — || May 4, 2005 || Mount Lemmon || Mount Lemmon Survey || — || align=right | 3.4 km || 
|-id=346 bgcolor=#d6d6d6
| 207346 ||  || — || May 4, 2005 || Mount Lemmon || Mount Lemmon Survey || — || align=right | 4.6 km || 
|-id=347 bgcolor=#d6d6d6
| 207347 ||  || — || May 4, 2005 || Kitt Peak || Spacewatch || — || align=right | 3.2 km || 
|-id=348 bgcolor=#d6d6d6
| 207348 ||  || — || May 3, 2005 || Kitt Peak || Spacewatch || HYG || align=right | 4.6 km || 
|-id=349 bgcolor=#d6d6d6
| 207349 ||  || — || May 4, 2005 || Kitt Peak || Spacewatch || HYG || align=right | 5.2 km || 
|-id=350 bgcolor=#d6d6d6
| 207350 ||  || — || May 8, 2005 || Mount Lemmon || Mount Lemmon Survey || — || align=right | 2.7 km || 
|-id=351 bgcolor=#E9E9E9
| 207351 ||  || — || May 6, 2005 || Catalina || CSS || EUN || align=right | 2.1 km || 
|-id=352 bgcolor=#E9E9E9
| 207352 ||  || — || May 7, 2005 || Kitt Peak || Spacewatch || — || align=right | 2.5 km || 
|-id=353 bgcolor=#E9E9E9
| 207353 ||  || — || May 11, 2005 || Palomar || NEAT || — || align=right | 3.3 km || 
|-id=354 bgcolor=#d6d6d6
| 207354 ||  || — || May 10, 2005 || Anderson Mesa || LONEOS || — || align=right | 3.9 km || 
|-id=355 bgcolor=#E9E9E9
| 207355 ||  || — || May 10, 2005 || Kitt Peak || Spacewatch || — || align=right | 2.1 km || 
|-id=356 bgcolor=#E9E9E9
| 207356 ||  || — || May 8, 2005 || Kitt Peak || Spacewatch || — || align=right | 1.2 km || 
|-id=357 bgcolor=#E9E9E9
| 207357 ||  || — || May 8, 2005 || Catalina || CSS || NEM || align=right | 4.0 km || 
|-id=358 bgcolor=#d6d6d6
| 207358 ||  || — || May 11, 2005 || Catalina || CSS || — || align=right | 5.3 km || 
|-id=359 bgcolor=#E9E9E9
| 207359 ||  || — || May 13, 2005 || Kitt Peak || Spacewatch || — || align=right | 2.2 km || 
|-id=360 bgcolor=#d6d6d6
| 207360 ||  || — || May 13, 2005 || Kitt Peak || Spacewatch || — || align=right | 4.6 km || 
|-id=361 bgcolor=#d6d6d6
| 207361 ||  || — || May 12, 2005 || Mount Lemmon || Mount Lemmon Survey || EOS || align=right | 2.7 km || 
|-id=362 bgcolor=#d6d6d6
| 207362 ||  || — || May 15, 2005 || Palomar || NEAT || — || align=right | 5.8 km || 
|-id=363 bgcolor=#E9E9E9
| 207363 ||  || — || May 15, 2005 || Palomar || NEAT || — || align=right | 3.0 km || 
|-id=364 bgcolor=#E9E9E9
| 207364 ||  || — || May 8, 2005 || Kitt Peak || Spacewatch || — || align=right | 3.1 km || 
|-id=365 bgcolor=#E9E9E9
| 207365 ||  || — || May 8, 2005 || Siding Spring || SSS || — || align=right | 2.6 km || 
|-id=366 bgcolor=#d6d6d6
| 207366 ||  || — || May 20, 2005 || Mount Lemmon || Mount Lemmon Survey || — || align=right | 3.7 km || 
|-id=367 bgcolor=#d6d6d6
| 207367 ||  || — || June 2, 2005 || Catalina || CSS || — || align=right | 4.0 km || 
|-id=368 bgcolor=#E9E9E9
| 207368 ||  || — || June 3, 2005 || Kitt Peak || Spacewatch || — || align=right | 2.8 km || 
|-id=369 bgcolor=#d6d6d6
| 207369 ||  || — || June 3, 2005 || Kitt Peak || Spacewatch || 3:2 || align=right | 6.5 km || 
|-id=370 bgcolor=#d6d6d6
| 207370 ||  || — || June 6, 2005 || Kitt Peak || Spacewatch || — || align=right | 4.5 km || 
|-id=371 bgcolor=#E9E9E9
| 207371 ||  || — || June 10, 2005 || Kitt Peak || Spacewatch || HOF || align=right | 3.3 km || 
|-id=372 bgcolor=#d6d6d6
| 207372 ||  || — || June 12, 2005 || Mount Lemmon || Mount Lemmon Survey || KOR || align=right | 1.6 km || 
|-id=373 bgcolor=#d6d6d6
| 207373 ||  || — || June 11, 2005 || Kitt Peak || Spacewatch || EOS || align=right | 2.6 km || 
|-id=374 bgcolor=#d6d6d6
| 207374 ||  || — || June 13, 2005 || Mount Lemmon || Mount Lemmon Survey || THM || align=right | 3.6 km || 
|-id=375 bgcolor=#d6d6d6
| 207375 ||  || — || June 28, 2005 || Kitt Peak || Spacewatch || — || align=right | 3.6 km || 
|-id=376 bgcolor=#d6d6d6
| 207376 ||  || — || June 30, 2005 || Kitt Peak || Spacewatch || 7:4 || align=right | 4.3 km || 
|-id=377 bgcolor=#d6d6d6
| 207377 ||  || — || July 4, 2005 || Mount Lemmon || Mount Lemmon Survey || THM || align=right | 3.1 km || 
|-id=378 bgcolor=#d6d6d6
| 207378 ||  || — || July 5, 2005 || Palomar || NEAT || SYL7:4 || align=right | 5.3 km || 
|-id=379 bgcolor=#d6d6d6
| 207379 ||  || — || July 6, 2005 || Kitt Peak || Spacewatch || 3:2 || align=right | 5.3 km || 
|-id=380 bgcolor=#d6d6d6
| 207380 ||  || — || July 28, 2005 || Palomar || NEAT || SHU3:2 || align=right | 9.3 km || 
|-id=381 bgcolor=#d6d6d6
| 207381 ||  || — || August 24, 2005 || Palomar || NEAT || 3:2 || align=right | 6.1 km || 
|-id=382 bgcolor=#d6d6d6
| 207382 ||  || — || August 28, 2005 || Drebach || J. Kandler || HIL3:2 || align=right | 8.1 km || 
|-id=383 bgcolor=#d6d6d6
| 207383 ||  || — || August 28, 2005 || Kitt Peak || Spacewatch || — || align=right | 5.0 km || 
|-id=384 bgcolor=#d6d6d6
| 207384 ||  || — || August 29, 2005 || Palomar || NEAT || HIL3:2 || align=right | 10 km || 
|-id=385 bgcolor=#d6d6d6
| 207385 Maxou ||  ||  || September 4, 2005 || Marly || P. Kocher || EUP || align=right | 8.2 km || 
|-id=386 bgcolor=#fefefe
| 207386 ||  || — || October 8, 2005 || Catalina || CSS || H || align=right data-sort-value="0.98" | 980 m || 
|-id=387 bgcolor=#d6d6d6
| 207387 ||  || — || October 7, 2005 || Kitt Peak || Spacewatch || SHU3:2 || align=right | 6.8 km || 
|-id=388 bgcolor=#d6d6d6
| 207388 ||  || — || October 12, 2005 || Kitt Peak || Spacewatch || — || align=right | 2.8 km || 
|-id=389 bgcolor=#fefefe
| 207389 ||  || — || November 12, 2005 || Socorro || LINEAR || H || align=right | 1.2 km || 
|-id=390 bgcolor=#fefefe
| 207390 ||  || — || November 11, 2005 || Socorro || LINEAR || H || align=right data-sort-value="0.81" | 810 m || 
|-id=391 bgcolor=#fefefe
| 207391 ||  || — || November 22, 2005 || Socorro || LINEAR || H || align=right data-sort-value="0.88" | 880 m || 
|-id=392 bgcolor=#fefefe
| 207392 ||  || — || November 25, 2005 || Kitt Peak || Spacewatch || H || align=right data-sort-value="0.91" | 910 m || 
|-id=393 bgcolor=#fefefe
| 207393 ||  || — || November 22, 2005 || Kitt Peak || Spacewatch || H || align=right | 1.0 km || 
|-id=394 bgcolor=#fefefe
| 207394 ||  || — || December 1, 2005 || Kitt Peak || M. W. Buie || FLO || align=right data-sort-value="0.72" | 720 m || 
|-id=395 bgcolor=#fefefe
| 207395 ||  || — || December 26, 2005 || Mount Lemmon || Mount Lemmon Survey || — || align=right data-sort-value="0.92" | 920 m || 
|-id=396 bgcolor=#fefefe
| 207396 ||  || — || December 29, 2005 || Kitt Peak || Spacewatch || — || align=right | 1.1 km || 
|-id=397 bgcolor=#fefefe
| 207397 ||  || — || December 30, 2005 || Mount Lemmon || Mount Lemmon Survey || — || align=right | 1.0 km || 
|-id=398 bgcolor=#FFC2E0
| 207398 ||  || — || January 5, 2006 || Mount Lemmon || Mount Lemmon Survey || APOPHA || align=right data-sort-value="0.30" | 300 m || 
|-id=399 bgcolor=#fefefe
| 207399 ||  || — || January 7, 2006 || Mount Lemmon || Mount Lemmon Survey || FLO || align=right data-sort-value="0.81" | 810 m || 
|-id=400 bgcolor=#fefefe
| 207400 ||  || — || January 25, 2006 || Kitt Peak || Spacewatch || — || align=right data-sort-value="0.81" | 810 m || 
|}

207401–207500 

|-bgcolor=#fefefe
| 207401 ||  || — || January 22, 2006 || Catalina || CSS || — || align=right | 1.1 km || 
|-id=402 bgcolor=#fefefe
| 207402 ||  || — || January 23, 2006 || Kitt Peak || Spacewatch || FLO || align=right data-sort-value="0.77" | 770 m || 
|-id=403 bgcolor=#fefefe
| 207403 ||  || — || January 24, 2006 || Socorro || LINEAR || — || align=right | 1.0 km || 
|-id=404 bgcolor=#fefefe
| 207404 ||  || — || January 26, 2006 || Kitt Peak || Spacewatch || NYS || align=right data-sort-value="0.98" | 980 m || 
|-id=405 bgcolor=#fefefe
| 207405 ||  || — || January 23, 2006 || Mount Lemmon || Mount Lemmon Survey || — || align=right | 1.0 km || 
|-id=406 bgcolor=#fefefe
| 207406 ||  || — || January 26, 2006 || Mount Lemmon || Mount Lemmon Survey || — || align=right data-sort-value="0.89" | 890 m || 
|-id=407 bgcolor=#fefefe
| 207407 ||  || — || January 26, 2006 || Mount Lemmon || Mount Lemmon Survey || FLO || align=right | 1.0 km || 
|-id=408 bgcolor=#FA8072
| 207408 ||  || — || January 27, 2006 || Kitt Peak || Spacewatch || — || align=right | 1.0 km || 
|-id=409 bgcolor=#fefefe
| 207409 ||  || — || January 30, 2006 || Bergisch Gladbach || W. Bickel || — || align=right data-sort-value="0.74" | 740 m || 
|-id=410 bgcolor=#fefefe
| 207410 ||  || — || January 31, 2006 || Kitt Peak || Spacewatch || FLO || align=right data-sort-value="0.84" | 840 m || 
|-id=411 bgcolor=#fefefe
| 207411 ||  || — || January 26, 2006 || Anderson Mesa || LONEOS || — || align=right | 1.1 km || 
|-id=412 bgcolor=#fefefe
| 207412 ||  || — || January 31, 2006 || Mount Lemmon || Mount Lemmon Survey || NYS || align=right data-sort-value="0.88" | 880 m || 
|-id=413 bgcolor=#fefefe
| 207413 ||  || — || February 20, 2006 || Catalina || CSS || — || align=right | 1.6 km || 
|-id=414 bgcolor=#fefefe
| 207414 ||  || — || February 20, 2006 || Kitt Peak || Spacewatch || NYS || align=right data-sort-value="0.87" | 870 m || 
|-id=415 bgcolor=#fefefe
| 207415 ||  || — || February 20, 2006 || Kitt Peak || Spacewatch || — || align=right | 1.1 km || 
|-id=416 bgcolor=#fefefe
| 207416 ||  || — || February 20, 2006 || Kitt Peak || Spacewatch || — || align=right | 1.3 km || 
|-id=417 bgcolor=#fefefe
| 207417 ||  || — || February 20, 2006 || Kitt Peak || Spacewatch || FLO || align=right data-sort-value="0.85" | 850 m || 
|-id=418 bgcolor=#d6d6d6
| 207418 ||  || — || February 24, 2006 || Kitt Peak || Spacewatch || KOR || align=right | 2.2 km || 
|-id=419 bgcolor=#fefefe
| 207419 ||  || — || February 24, 2006 || Mount Lemmon || Mount Lemmon Survey || — || align=right | 1.6 km || 
|-id=420 bgcolor=#fefefe
| 207420 Jehin ||  ||  || February 21, 2006 || Anderson Mesa || LONEOS || NYS || align=right data-sort-value="0.97" | 970 m || 
|-id=421 bgcolor=#fefefe
| 207421 ||  || — || February 24, 2006 || Kitt Peak || Spacewatch || — || align=right data-sort-value="0.78" | 780 m || 
|-id=422 bgcolor=#fefefe
| 207422 ||  || — || February 24, 2006 || Kitt Peak || Spacewatch || MAS || align=right | 1.1 km || 
|-id=423 bgcolor=#fefefe
| 207423 ||  || — || February 24, 2006 || Kitt Peak || Spacewatch || — || align=right | 1.5 km || 
|-id=424 bgcolor=#d6d6d6
| 207424 ||  || — || February 24, 2006 || Kitt Peak || Spacewatch || THM || align=right | 3.3 km || 
|-id=425 bgcolor=#fefefe
| 207425 ||  || — || February 24, 2006 || Mount Lemmon || Mount Lemmon Survey || — || align=right | 1.2 km || 
|-id=426 bgcolor=#fefefe
| 207426 ||  || — || February 25, 2006 || Kitt Peak || Spacewatch || NYS || align=right | 1.0 km || 
|-id=427 bgcolor=#fefefe
| 207427 ||  || — || February 25, 2006 || Mount Lemmon || Mount Lemmon Survey || — || align=right | 1.1 km || 
|-id=428 bgcolor=#fefefe
| 207428 ||  || — || February 25, 2006 || Mount Lemmon || Mount Lemmon Survey || — || align=right data-sort-value="0.68" | 680 m || 
|-id=429 bgcolor=#fefefe
| 207429 ||  || — || February 25, 2006 || Mount Lemmon || Mount Lemmon Survey || — || align=right data-sort-value="0.97" | 970 m || 
|-id=430 bgcolor=#fefefe
| 207430 ||  || — || February 27, 2006 || Kitt Peak || Spacewatch || FLO || align=right data-sort-value="0.80" | 800 m || 
|-id=431 bgcolor=#fefefe
| 207431 ||  || — || February 25, 2006 || Mount Lemmon || Mount Lemmon Survey || — || align=right data-sort-value="0.89" | 890 m || 
|-id=432 bgcolor=#d6d6d6
| 207432 ||  || — || February 27, 2006 || Kitt Peak || Spacewatch || HYG || align=right | 4.0 km || 
|-id=433 bgcolor=#E9E9E9
| 207433 ||  || — || February 27, 2006 || Kitt Peak || Spacewatch || — || align=right | 2.9 km || 
|-id=434 bgcolor=#fefefe
| 207434 ||  || — || February 27, 2006 || Kitt Peak || Spacewatch || V || align=right data-sort-value="0.76" | 760 m || 
|-id=435 bgcolor=#fefefe
| 207435 ||  || — || February 28, 2006 || Socorro || LINEAR || FLO || align=right | 1.1 km || 
|-id=436 bgcolor=#fefefe
| 207436 ||  || — || February 25, 2006 || Kitt Peak || Spacewatch || — || align=right | 1.2 km || 
|-id=437 bgcolor=#fefefe
| 207437 ||  || — || February 27, 2006 || Kitt Peak || Spacewatch || — || align=right | 1.3 km || 
|-id=438 bgcolor=#fefefe
| 207438 ||  || — || February 21, 2006 || Mount Lemmon || Mount Lemmon Survey || NYS || align=right data-sort-value="0.92" | 920 m || 
|-id=439 bgcolor=#fefefe
| 207439 ||  || — || March 5, 2006 || Mount Lemmon || Mount Lemmon Survey || — || align=right | 1.0 km || 
|-id=440 bgcolor=#fefefe
| 207440 ||  || — || March 2, 2006 || Kitt Peak || Spacewatch || NYS || align=right | 1.2 km || 
|-id=441 bgcolor=#fefefe
| 207441 ||  || — || March 2, 2006 || Kitt Peak || Spacewatch || — || align=right | 1.4 km || 
|-id=442 bgcolor=#fefefe
| 207442 ||  || — || March 2, 2006 || Kitt Peak || Spacewatch || — || align=right data-sort-value="0.98" | 980 m || 
|-id=443 bgcolor=#E9E9E9
| 207443 ||  || — || March 3, 2006 || Kitt Peak || Spacewatch || MIS || align=right | 3.3 km || 
|-id=444 bgcolor=#fefefe
| 207444 ||  || — || March 3, 2006 || Kitt Peak || Spacewatch || — || align=right data-sort-value="0.94" | 940 m || 
|-id=445 bgcolor=#fefefe
| 207445 ||  || — || March 3, 2006 || Kitt Peak || Spacewatch || FLO || align=right data-sort-value="0.86" | 860 m || 
|-id=446 bgcolor=#fefefe
| 207446 ||  || — || March 5, 2006 || Kitt Peak || Spacewatch || — || align=right | 1.0 km || 
|-id=447 bgcolor=#fefefe
| 207447 ||  || — || March 5, 2006 || Kitt Peak || Spacewatch || — || align=right | 1.1 km || 
|-id=448 bgcolor=#d6d6d6
| 207448 ||  || — || March 23, 2006 || Kitt Peak || Spacewatch || KOR || align=right | 1.9 km || 
|-id=449 bgcolor=#fefefe
| 207449 ||  || — || March 23, 2006 || Kitt Peak || Spacewatch || — || align=right | 1.3 km || 
|-id=450 bgcolor=#fefefe
| 207450 ||  || — || March 24, 2006 || Kitt Peak || Spacewatch || — || align=right data-sort-value="0.79" | 790 m || 
|-id=451 bgcolor=#fefefe
| 207451 ||  || — || March 24, 2006 || Catalina || CSS || V || align=right | 1.2 km || 
|-id=452 bgcolor=#fefefe
| 207452 ||  || — || March 23, 2006 || Socorro || LINEAR || — || align=right | 2.6 km || 
|-id=453 bgcolor=#fefefe
| 207453 ||  || — || March 24, 2006 || Socorro || LINEAR || V || align=right data-sort-value="0.99" | 990 m || 
|-id=454 bgcolor=#fefefe
| 207454 ||  || — || March 26, 2006 || Mount Lemmon || Mount Lemmon Survey || — || align=right data-sort-value="0.82" | 820 m || 
|-id=455 bgcolor=#fefefe
| 207455 ||  || — || April 2, 2006 || Kitt Peak || Spacewatch || — || align=right | 1.2 km || 
|-id=456 bgcolor=#E9E9E9
| 207456 ||  || — || April 2, 2006 || Kitt Peak || Spacewatch || — || align=right | 1.3 km || 
|-id=457 bgcolor=#fefefe
| 207457 ||  || — || April 2, 2006 || Kitt Peak || Spacewatch || V || align=right data-sort-value="0.87" | 870 m || 
|-id=458 bgcolor=#fefefe
| 207458 ||  || — || April 2, 2006 || Kitt Peak || Spacewatch || NYS || align=right | 2.9 km || 
|-id=459 bgcolor=#fefefe
| 207459 ||  || — || April 2, 2006 || Kitt Peak || Spacewatch || NYS || align=right data-sort-value="0.81" | 810 m || 
|-id=460 bgcolor=#fefefe
| 207460 ||  || — || April 7, 2006 || Kitt Peak || Spacewatch || — || align=right | 1.3 km || 
|-id=461 bgcolor=#E9E9E9
| 207461 ||  || — || April 7, 2006 || Anderson Mesa || LONEOS || — || align=right | 3.7 km || 
|-id=462 bgcolor=#fefefe
| 207462 ||  || — || April 8, 2006 || Mount Lemmon || Mount Lemmon Survey || NYS || align=right | 3.0 km || 
|-id=463 bgcolor=#fefefe
| 207463 ||  || — || April 6, 2006 || Siding Spring || SSS || — || align=right | 1.3 km || 
|-id=464 bgcolor=#fefefe
| 207464 ||  || — || April 6, 2006 || Socorro || LINEAR || — || align=right | 1.4 km || 
|-id=465 bgcolor=#fefefe
| 207465 ||  || — || April 7, 2006 || Catalina || CSS || — || align=right | 1.3 km || 
|-id=466 bgcolor=#fefefe
| 207466 ||  || — || April 9, 2006 || Socorro || LINEAR || FLO || align=right | 1.6 km || 
|-id=467 bgcolor=#fefefe
| 207467 ||  || — || April 2, 2006 || Kitt Peak || Spacewatch || V || align=right | 1.0 km || 
|-id=468 bgcolor=#fefefe
| 207468 ||  || — || April 8, 2006 || Kitt Peak || Spacewatch || — || align=right | 1.2 km || 
|-id=469 bgcolor=#fefefe
| 207469 ||  || — || April 6, 2006 || Socorro || LINEAR || FLO || align=right | 1.1 km || 
|-id=470 bgcolor=#fefefe
| 207470 ||  || — || April 18, 2006 || Palomar || NEAT || NYS || align=right data-sort-value="0.79" | 790 m || 
|-id=471 bgcolor=#fefefe
| 207471 ||  || — || April 18, 2006 || Anderson Mesa || LONEOS || FLO || align=right | 1.7 km || 
|-id=472 bgcolor=#fefefe
| 207472 ||  || — || April 18, 2006 || Anderson Mesa || LONEOS || — || align=right | 1.5 km || 
|-id=473 bgcolor=#fefefe
| 207473 ||  || — || April 19, 2006 || Palomar || NEAT || — || align=right | 1.4 km || 
|-id=474 bgcolor=#fefefe
| 207474 ||  || — || April 20, 2006 || Kitt Peak || Spacewatch || — || align=right | 1.3 km || 
|-id=475 bgcolor=#fefefe
| 207475 ||  || — || April 19, 2006 || Mount Lemmon || Mount Lemmon Survey || FLO || align=right data-sort-value="0.87" | 870 m || 
|-id=476 bgcolor=#fefefe
| 207476 ||  || — || April 20, 2006 || Kitt Peak || Spacewatch || NYS || align=right data-sort-value="0.76" | 760 m || 
|-id=477 bgcolor=#E9E9E9
| 207477 ||  || — || April 20, 2006 || Kitt Peak || Spacewatch || — || align=right | 1.8 km || 
|-id=478 bgcolor=#fefefe
| 207478 ||  || — || April 20, 2006 || Catalina || CSS || NYS || align=right data-sort-value="0.96" | 960 m || 
|-id=479 bgcolor=#fefefe
| 207479 ||  || — || April 20, 2006 || Mount Lemmon || Mount Lemmon Survey || — || align=right | 1.2 km || 
|-id=480 bgcolor=#fefefe
| 207480 ||  || — || April 21, 2006 || Catalina || CSS || — || align=right | 1.2 km || 
|-id=481 bgcolor=#fefefe
| 207481 ||  || — || April 24, 2006 || Piszkéstető || K. Sárneczky || — || align=right | 1.0 km || 
|-id=482 bgcolor=#fefefe
| 207482 ||  || — || April 18, 2006 || Palomar || NEAT || ERI || align=right | 1.7 km || 
|-id=483 bgcolor=#E9E9E9
| 207483 ||  || — || April 21, 2006 || Kitt Peak || Spacewatch || — || align=right | 2.3 km || 
|-id=484 bgcolor=#fefefe
| 207484 ||  || — || April 24, 2006 || Mount Lemmon || Mount Lemmon Survey || — || align=right | 1.0 km || 
|-id=485 bgcolor=#fefefe
| 207485 ||  || — || April 19, 2006 || Catalina || CSS || V || align=right | 1.0 km || 
|-id=486 bgcolor=#fefefe
| 207486 ||  || — || April 24, 2006 || Kitt Peak || Spacewatch || — || align=right data-sort-value="0.90" | 900 m || 
|-id=487 bgcolor=#E9E9E9
| 207487 ||  || — || April 26, 2006 || Reedy Creek || J. Broughton || — || align=right | 3.0 km || 
|-id=488 bgcolor=#fefefe
| 207488 ||  || — || April 26, 2006 || Reedy Creek || J. Broughton || — || align=right | 1.3 km || 
|-id=489 bgcolor=#fefefe
| 207489 ||  || — || April 19, 2006 || Catalina || CSS || — || align=right | 1.1 km || 
|-id=490 bgcolor=#fefefe
| 207490 ||  || — || April 20, 2006 || Catalina || CSS || — || align=right | 1.1 km || 
|-id=491 bgcolor=#fefefe
| 207491 ||  || — || April 24, 2006 || Socorro || LINEAR || NYS || align=right data-sort-value="0.83" | 830 m || 
|-id=492 bgcolor=#fefefe
| 207492 ||  || — || April 24, 2006 || Kitt Peak || Spacewatch || NYS || align=right | 1.4 km || 
|-id=493 bgcolor=#E9E9E9
| 207493 ||  || — || April 24, 2006 || Kitt Peak || Spacewatch || AGN || align=right | 1.7 km || 
|-id=494 bgcolor=#fefefe
| 207494 ||  || — || April 24, 2006 || Kitt Peak || Spacewatch || — || align=right data-sort-value="0.80" | 800 m || 
|-id=495 bgcolor=#fefefe
| 207495 ||  || — || April 25, 2006 || Kitt Peak || Spacewatch || — || align=right | 1.3 km || 
|-id=496 bgcolor=#fefefe
| 207496 ||  || — || April 26, 2006 || Kitt Peak || Spacewatch || V || align=right data-sort-value="0.92" | 920 m || 
|-id=497 bgcolor=#fefefe
| 207497 ||  || — || April 26, 2006 || Kitt Peak || Spacewatch || — || align=right | 2.0 km || 
|-id=498 bgcolor=#fefefe
| 207498 ||  || — || April 30, 2006 || Kitt Peak || Spacewatch || — || align=right | 1.1 km || 
|-id=499 bgcolor=#fefefe
| 207499 ||  || — || April 30, 2006 || Catalina || CSS || FLO || align=right | 1.0 km || 
|-id=500 bgcolor=#fefefe
| 207500 ||  || — || April 19, 2006 || Catalina || CSS || FLO || align=right | 1.6 km || 
|}

207501–207600 

|-bgcolor=#fefefe
| 207501 ||  || — || April 29, 2006 || Siding Spring || SSS || — || align=right | 1.2 km || 
|-id=502 bgcolor=#E9E9E9
| 207502 ||  || — || April 30, 2006 || Catalina || CSS || — || align=right | 1.5 km || 
|-id=503 bgcolor=#fefefe
| 207503 ||  || — || April 30, 2006 || Kitt Peak || Spacewatch || — || align=right | 1.2 km || 
|-id=504 bgcolor=#E9E9E9
| 207504 Markusovszky ||  ||  || April 25, 2006 || Piszkéstető || K. Sárneczky || — || align=right | 1.2 km || 
|-id=505 bgcolor=#E9E9E9
| 207505 ||  || — || May 1, 2006 || Socorro || LINEAR || DOR || align=right | 3.3 km || 
|-id=506 bgcolor=#fefefe
| 207506 ||  || — || May 2, 2006 || Mount Lemmon || Mount Lemmon Survey || NYS || align=right data-sort-value="0.92" | 920 m || 
|-id=507 bgcolor=#E9E9E9
| 207507 ||  || — || May 3, 2006 || Mount Lemmon || Mount Lemmon Survey || — || align=right | 1.7 km || 
|-id=508 bgcolor=#fefefe
| 207508 ||  || — || May 1, 2006 || Kitt Peak || Spacewatch || — || align=right | 1.3 km || 
|-id=509 bgcolor=#fefefe
| 207509 ||  || — || May 1, 2006 || Kitt Peak || Spacewatch || — || align=right | 1.4 km || 
|-id=510 bgcolor=#fefefe
| 207510 ||  || — || May 4, 2006 || Mount Lemmon || Mount Lemmon Survey || NYS || align=right data-sort-value="0.94" | 940 m || 
|-id=511 bgcolor=#fefefe
| 207511 ||  || — || May 2, 2006 || Kitt Peak || Spacewatch || NYS || align=right | 1.0 km || 
|-id=512 bgcolor=#E9E9E9
| 207512 ||  || — || May 2, 2006 || Mount Lemmon || Mount Lemmon Survey || HEN || align=right | 1.6 km || 
|-id=513 bgcolor=#E9E9E9
| 207513 ||  || — || May 3, 2006 || Kitt Peak || Spacewatch || HOF || align=right | 4.6 km || 
|-id=514 bgcolor=#E9E9E9
| 207514 ||  || — || May 3, 2006 || Kitt Peak || Spacewatch || — || align=right | 1.4 km || 
|-id=515 bgcolor=#E9E9E9
| 207515 ||  || — || May 3, 2006 || Kitt Peak || Spacewatch || — || align=right | 1.4 km || 
|-id=516 bgcolor=#E9E9E9
| 207516 ||  || — || May 4, 2006 || Kitt Peak || Spacewatch || — || align=right | 1.9 km || 
|-id=517 bgcolor=#d6d6d6
| 207517 ||  || — || May 4, 2006 || Kitt Peak || Spacewatch || — || align=right | 4.5 km || 
|-id=518 bgcolor=#E9E9E9
| 207518 ||  || — || May 4, 2006 || Kitt Peak || Spacewatch || — || align=right | 1.1 km || 
|-id=519 bgcolor=#d6d6d6
| 207519 ||  || — || May 7, 2006 || Kitt Peak || Spacewatch || KOR || align=right | 1.7 km || 
|-id=520 bgcolor=#E9E9E9
| 207520 ||  || — || May 7, 2006 || Mount Lemmon || Mount Lemmon Survey || — || align=right | 1.4 km || 
|-id=521 bgcolor=#fefefe
| 207521 ||  || — || May 1, 2006 || Junk Bond || D. Healy || NYS || align=right data-sort-value="0.90" | 900 m || 
|-id=522 bgcolor=#fefefe
| 207522 ||  || — || May 7, 2006 || Mount Lemmon || Mount Lemmon Survey || MAS || align=right | 1.0 km || 
|-id=523 bgcolor=#E9E9E9
| 207523 ||  || — || May 7, 2006 || Mount Lemmon || Mount Lemmon Survey || — || align=right | 4.3 km || 
|-id=524 bgcolor=#E9E9E9
| 207524 ||  || — || May 9, 2006 || Mount Lemmon || Mount Lemmon Survey || — || align=right | 2.9 km || 
|-id=525 bgcolor=#E9E9E9
| 207525 ||  || — || May 6, 2006 || Mount Lemmon || Mount Lemmon Survey || — || align=right | 1.9 km || 
|-id=526 bgcolor=#fefefe
| 207526 ||  || — || May 8, 2006 || Mount Lemmon || Mount Lemmon Survey || — || align=right | 1.3 km || 
|-id=527 bgcolor=#fefefe
| 207527 || 2006 KF || — || May 16, 2006 || Palomar || NEAT || — || align=right | 2.5 km || 
|-id=528 bgcolor=#fefefe
| 207528 ||  || — || May 18, 2006 || Palomar || NEAT || NYS || align=right data-sort-value="0.79" | 790 m || 
|-id=529 bgcolor=#E9E9E9
| 207529 ||  || — || May 19, 2006 || Anderson Mesa || LONEOS || ADE || align=right | 2.8 km || 
|-id=530 bgcolor=#fefefe
| 207530 ||  || — || May 19, 2006 || Palomar || NEAT || — || align=right | 1.4 km || 
|-id=531 bgcolor=#E9E9E9
| 207531 ||  || — || May 20, 2006 || Palomar || NEAT || — || align=right | 1.6 km || 
|-id=532 bgcolor=#E9E9E9
| 207532 ||  || — || May 19, 2006 || Mount Lemmon || Mount Lemmon Survey || — || align=right | 4.0 km || 
|-id=533 bgcolor=#fefefe
| 207533 ||  || — || May 16, 2006 || Siding Spring || SSS || NYS || align=right | 2.4 km || 
|-id=534 bgcolor=#E9E9E9
| 207534 ||  || — || May 20, 2006 || Kitt Peak || Spacewatch || — || align=right | 1.8 km || 
|-id=535 bgcolor=#E9E9E9
| 207535 ||  || — || May 20, 2006 || Kitt Peak || Spacewatch || — || align=right | 1.1 km || 
|-id=536 bgcolor=#fefefe
| 207536 ||  || — || May 16, 2006 || Siding Spring || SSS || NYS || align=right | 1.1 km || 
|-id=537 bgcolor=#fefefe
| 207537 ||  || — || May 18, 2006 || Palomar || NEAT || — || align=right | 1.2 km || 
|-id=538 bgcolor=#fefefe
| 207538 ||  || — || May 21, 2006 || Kitt Peak || Spacewatch || — || align=right | 1.3 km || 
|-id=539 bgcolor=#E9E9E9
| 207539 ||  || — || May 21, 2006 || Kitt Peak || Spacewatch || — || align=right | 2.4 km || 
|-id=540 bgcolor=#fefefe
| 207540 ||  || — || May 21, 2006 || Siding Spring || SSS || — || align=right | 2.0 km || 
|-id=541 bgcolor=#E9E9E9
| 207541 ||  || — || May 22, 2006 || Kitt Peak || Spacewatch || — || align=right | 1.3 km || 
|-id=542 bgcolor=#E9E9E9
| 207542 ||  || — || May 22, 2006 || Kitt Peak || Spacewatch || — || align=right | 1.4 km || 
|-id=543 bgcolor=#fefefe
| 207543 ||  || — || May 22, 2006 || Kitt Peak || Spacewatch || V || align=right | 1.1 km || 
|-id=544 bgcolor=#E9E9E9
| 207544 ||  || — || May 24, 2006 || Palomar || NEAT || — || align=right | 1.9 km || 
|-id=545 bgcolor=#E9E9E9
| 207545 ||  || — || May 31, 2006 || Kitt Peak || Spacewatch || ADE || align=right | 3.1 km || 
|-id=546 bgcolor=#fefefe
| 207546 || 2006 LL || — || June 1, 2006 || Mount Lemmon || Mount Lemmon Survey || NYS || align=right data-sort-value="0.78" | 780 m || 
|-id=547 bgcolor=#d6d6d6
| 207547 Charito || 2006 LO ||  || June 2, 2006 || La Cañada || J. Lacruz || — || align=right | 3.8 km || 
|-id=548 bgcolor=#E9E9E9
| 207548 || 2006 LZ || — || June 4, 2006 || Wrightwood || J. W. Young || — || align=right | 1.8 km || 
|-id=549 bgcolor=#fefefe
| 207549 ||  || — || June 5, 2006 || Socorro || LINEAR || NYS || align=right | 1.2 km || 
|-id=550 bgcolor=#fefefe
| 207550 ||  || — || June 2, 2006 || Mount Lemmon || Mount Lemmon Survey || NYS || align=right data-sort-value="0.86" | 860 m || 
|-id=551 bgcolor=#E9E9E9
| 207551 ||  || — || June 15, 2006 || Kitt Peak || Spacewatch || EUN || align=right | 2.2 km || 
|-id=552 bgcolor=#d6d6d6
| 207552 ||  || — || June 10, 2006 || Palomar || NEAT || — || align=right | 4.0 km || 
|-id=553 bgcolor=#fefefe
| 207553 ||  || — || June 6, 2006 || Siding Spring || SSS || — || align=right | 1.3 km || 
|-id=554 bgcolor=#E9E9E9
| 207554 ||  || — || June 14, 2006 || Palomar || NEAT || — || align=right | 3.7 km || 
|-id=555 bgcolor=#E9E9E9
| 207555 ||  || — || June 4, 2006 || Socorro || LINEAR || — || align=right | 2.2 km || 
|-id=556 bgcolor=#d6d6d6
| 207556 ||  || — || June 3, 2006 || Mount Lemmon || Mount Lemmon Survey || — || align=right | 4.9 km || 
|-id=557 bgcolor=#d6d6d6
| 207557 ||  || — || June 18, 2006 || Kitt Peak || Spacewatch || EOS || align=right | 3.0 km || 
|-id=558 bgcolor=#d6d6d6
| 207558 ||  || — || June 18, 2006 || Kitt Peak || Spacewatch || — || align=right | 2.7 km || 
|-id=559 bgcolor=#E9E9E9
| 207559 ||  || — || July 17, 2006 || Reedy Creek || J. Broughton || MRX || align=right | 1.7 km || 
|-id=560 bgcolor=#E9E9E9
| 207560 ||  || — || July 19, 2006 || Palomar || NEAT || — || align=right | 4.1 km || 
|-id=561 bgcolor=#d6d6d6
| 207561 ||  || — || July 19, 2006 || Palomar || NEAT || MEL || align=right | 6.6 km || 
|-id=562 bgcolor=#d6d6d6
| 207562 ||  || — || July 30, 2006 || Eskridge || Farpoint Obs. || EUP || align=right | 7.8 km || 
|-id=563 bgcolor=#d6d6d6
| 207563 Toscana || 2006 PC ||  || August 1, 2006 || Vallemare di Borbona || V. S. Casulli || — || align=right | 4.4 km || 
|-id=564 bgcolor=#fefefe
| 207564 || 2006 PZ || — || August 13, 2006 || Dax || Dax Obs. || — || align=right | 2.5 km || 
|-id=565 bgcolor=#d6d6d6
| 207565 ||  || — || August 10, 2006 || Palomar || NEAT || — || align=right | 7.3 km || 
|-id=566 bgcolor=#d6d6d6
| 207566 ||  || — || August 12, 2006 || Palomar || NEAT || 628 || align=right | 2.7 km || 
|-id=567 bgcolor=#E9E9E9
| 207567 ||  || — || August 14, 2006 || Hibiscus || S. F. Hönig || — || align=right | 2.3 km || 
|-id=568 bgcolor=#d6d6d6
| 207568 ||  || — || August 12, 2006 || Palomar || NEAT || — || align=right | 5.4 km || 
|-id=569 bgcolor=#fefefe
| 207569 ||  || — || August 13, 2006 || Palomar || NEAT || MAS || align=right data-sort-value="0.99" | 990 m || 
|-id=570 bgcolor=#d6d6d6
| 207570 ||  || — || August 13, 2006 || Palomar || NEAT || EOS || align=right | 2.6 km || 
|-id=571 bgcolor=#E9E9E9
| 207571 ||  || — || August 14, 2006 || Siding Spring || SSS || — || align=right | 3.9 km || 
|-id=572 bgcolor=#d6d6d6
| 207572 ||  || — || August 15, 2006 || Palomar || NEAT || — || align=right | 4.5 km || 
|-id=573 bgcolor=#d6d6d6
| 207573 ||  || — || August 13, 2006 || Palomar || NEAT || — || align=right | 3.7 km || 
|-id=574 bgcolor=#E9E9E9
| 207574 ||  || — || August 15, 2006 || Palomar || NEAT || — || align=right | 3.4 km || 
|-id=575 bgcolor=#E9E9E9
| 207575 ||  || — || August 12, 2006 || Palomar || NEAT || — || align=right | 1.8 km || 
|-id=576 bgcolor=#d6d6d6
| 207576 ||  || — || August 13, 2006 || Palomar || NEAT || VER || align=right | 4.4 km || 
|-id=577 bgcolor=#E9E9E9
| 207577 ||  || — || August 13, 2006 || Palomar || NEAT || HOF || align=right | 3.4 km || 
|-id=578 bgcolor=#d6d6d6
| 207578 ||  || — || August 13, 2006 || Palomar || NEAT || KOR || align=right | 1.8 km || 
|-id=579 bgcolor=#E9E9E9
| 207579 ||  || — || August 17, 2006 || Palomar || NEAT || — || align=right | 3.7 km || 
|-id=580 bgcolor=#d6d6d6
| 207580 ||  || — || August 17, 2006 || Palomar || NEAT || — || align=right | 6.5 km || 
|-id=581 bgcolor=#E9E9E9
| 207581 ||  || — || August 19, 2006 || Kitt Peak || Spacewatch || — || align=right | 2.8 km || 
|-id=582 bgcolor=#d6d6d6
| 207582 ||  || — || August 19, 2006 || Kitt Peak || Spacewatch || — || align=right | 5.1 km || 
|-id=583 bgcolor=#d6d6d6
| 207583 ||  || — || August 17, 2006 || Palomar || NEAT || — || align=right | 3.7 km || 
|-id=584 bgcolor=#d6d6d6
| 207584 ||  || — || August 20, 2006 || Palomar || NEAT || — || align=right | 4.2 km || 
|-id=585 bgcolor=#fefefe
| 207585 Lubar ||  ||  || August 17, 2006 || Andrushivka || Andrushivka Obs. || ERI || align=right | 3.2 km || 
|-id=586 bgcolor=#d6d6d6
| 207586 ||  || — || August 19, 2006 || Kitt Peak || Spacewatch || — || align=right | 4.3 km || 
|-id=587 bgcolor=#d6d6d6
| 207587 ||  || — || August 18, 2006 || Anderson Mesa || LONEOS || — || align=right | 4.1 km || 
|-id=588 bgcolor=#d6d6d6
| 207588 ||  || — || August 23, 2006 || Palomar || NEAT || — || align=right | 3.4 km || 
|-id=589 bgcolor=#d6d6d6
| 207589 ||  || — || August 17, 2006 || Palomar || NEAT || EOS || align=right | 3.1 km || 
|-id=590 bgcolor=#d6d6d6
| 207590 ||  || — || August 19, 2006 || Kitt Peak || Spacewatch || — || align=right | 4.0 km || 
|-id=591 bgcolor=#d6d6d6
| 207591 ||  || — || August 19, 2006 || Kitt Peak || Spacewatch || SHU3:2 || align=right | 10 km || 
|-id=592 bgcolor=#d6d6d6
| 207592 ||  || — || August 24, 2006 || Socorro || LINEAR || — || align=right | 5.7 km || 
|-id=593 bgcolor=#d6d6d6
| 207593 ||  || — || August 19, 2006 || Anderson Mesa || LONEOS || — || align=right | 4.5 km || 
|-id=594 bgcolor=#d6d6d6
| 207594 ||  || — || August 21, 2006 || Palomar || NEAT || EOS || align=right | 3.4 km || 
|-id=595 bgcolor=#d6d6d6
| 207595 ||  || — || August 24, 2006 || Eskridge || Farpoint Obs. || KOR || align=right | 2.0 km || 
|-id=596 bgcolor=#d6d6d6
| 207596 ||  || — || August 24, 2006 || Palomar || NEAT || — || align=right | 3.9 km || 
|-id=597 bgcolor=#E9E9E9
| 207597 ||  || — || August 27, 2006 || Kitt Peak || Spacewatch || — || align=right | 3.1 km || 
|-id=598 bgcolor=#d6d6d6
| 207598 ||  || — || August 27, 2006 || Kitt Peak || Spacewatch || — || align=right | 4.2 km || 
|-id=599 bgcolor=#d6d6d6
| 207599 ||  || — || August 16, 2006 || Palomar || NEAT || — || align=right | 4.4 km || 
|-id=600 bgcolor=#E9E9E9
| 207600 ||  || — || August 16, 2006 || Palomar || NEAT || GEF || align=right | 2.1 km || 
|}

207601–207700 

|-bgcolor=#d6d6d6
| 207601 ||  || — || August 24, 2006 || Palomar || NEAT || URS || align=right | 5.6 km || 
|-id=602 bgcolor=#E9E9E9
| 207602 ||  || — || August 28, 2006 || Catalina || CSS || — || align=right | 4.4 km || 
|-id=603 bgcolor=#d6d6d6
| 207603 Liuchaohan ||  ||  || August 27, 2006 || Lulin Observatory || H.-C. Lin, Q.-z. Ye || — || align=right | 3.2 km || 
|-id=604 bgcolor=#E9E9E9
| 207604 ||  || — || August 22, 2006 || Palomar || NEAT || — || align=right | 4.0 km || 
|-id=605 bgcolor=#d6d6d6
| 207605 ||  || — || August 25, 2006 || Socorro || LINEAR || SHU3:2 || align=right | 8.9 km || 
|-id=606 bgcolor=#d6d6d6
| 207606 ||  || — || August 29, 2006 || Catalina || CSS || EOS || align=right | 2.9 km || 
|-id=607 bgcolor=#d6d6d6
| 207607 ||  || — || August 19, 2006 || Palomar || NEAT || — || align=right | 4.6 km || 
|-id=608 bgcolor=#d6d6d6
| 207608 ||  || — || August 18, 2006 || Palomar || NEAT || — || align=right | 5.3 km || 
|-id=609 bgcolor=#d6d6d6
| 207609 ||  || — || August 18, 2006 || Palomar || NEAT || — || align=right | 5.2 km || 
|-id=610 bgcolor=#d6d6d6
| 207610 ||  || — || August 19, 2006 || Kitt Peak || Spacewatch || — || align=right | 2.9 km || 
|-id=611 bgcolor=#d6d6d6
| 207611 ||  || — || August 19, 2006 || Kitt Peak || Spacewatch || ALA || align=right | 5.8 km || 
|-id=612 bgcolor=#d6d6d6
| 207612 ||  || — || August 21, 2006 || Kitt Peak || Spacewatch || — || align=right | 3.7 km || 
|-id=613 bgcolor=#d6d6d6
| 207613 ||  || — || September 13, 2006 || Palomar || NEAT || KAR || align=right | 1.8 km || 
|-id=614 bgcolor=#d6d6d6
| 207614 ||  || — || September 14, 2006 || Kitt Peak || Spacewatch || — || align=right | 3.7 km || 
|-id=615 bgcolor=#d6d6d6
| 207615 ||  || — || September 14, 2006 || Palomar || NEAT || EOS || align=right | 3.4 km || 
|-id=616 bgcolor=#d6d6d6
| 207616 ||  || — || September 12, 2006 || Catalina || CSS || — || align=right | 3.5 km || 
|-id=617 bgcolor=#d6d6d6
| 207617 ||  || — || September 14, 2006 || Kitt Peak || Spacewatch || HYG || align=right | 4.0 km || 
|-id=618 bgcolor=#d6d6d6
| 207618 ||  || — || September 14, 2006 || Kitt Peak || Spacewatch || — || align=right | 3.6 km || 
|-id=619 bgcolor=#d6d6d6
| 207619 ||  || — || September 14, 2006 || Palomar || NEAT || HYG || align=right | 4.3 km || 
|-id=620 bgcolor=#d6d6d6
| 207620 ||  || — || September 15, 2006 || Kitt Peak || Spacewatch || — || align=right | 3.0 km || 
|-id=621 bgcolor=#d6d6d6
| 207621 ||  || — || September 15, 2006 || Kitt Peak || Spacewatch || THM || align=right | 3.5 km || 
|-id=622 bgcolor=#d6d6d6
| 207622 ||  || — || September 15, 2006 || Kitt Peak || Spacewatch || HYG || align=right | 3.2 km || 
|-id=623 bgcolor=#d6d6d6
| 207623 ||  || — || September 16, 2006 || Palomar || NEAT || SHU3:2 || align=right | 9.6 km || 
|-id=624 bgcolor=#d6d6d6
| 207624 ||  || — || September 17, 2006 || Catalina || CSS || HYG || align=right | 4.0 km || 
|-id=625 bgcolor=#d6d6d6
| 207625 ||  || — || September 18, 2006 || Kitt Peak || Spacewatch || — || align=right | 4.1 km || 
|-id=626 bgcolor=#d6d6d6
| 207626 ||  || — || September 20, 2006 || Catalina || CSS || CRO || align=right | 5.2 km || 
|-id=627 bgcolor=#d6d6d6
| 207627 ||  || — || September 18, 2006 || Kitt Peak || Spacewatch || THM || align=right | 2.7 km || 
|-id=628 bgcolor=#d6d6d6
| 207628 ||  || — || September 22, 2006 || Socorro || LINEAR || — || align=right | 3.5 km || 
|-id=629 bgcolor=#d6d6d6
| 207629 ||  || — || September 19, 2006 || Kitt Peak || Spacewatch || — || align=right | 4.8 km || 
|-id=630 bgcolor=#d6d6d6
| 207630 ||  || — || September 25, 2006 || Kitt Peak || Spacewatch || 3:2 || align=right | 6.1 km || 
|-id=631 bgcolor=#d6d6d6
| 207631 ||  || — || September 26, 2006 || Mount Lemmon || Mount Lemmon Survey || — || align=right | 3.0 km || 
|-id=632 bgcolor=#d6d6d6
| 207632 ||  || — || September 26, 2006 || Socorro || LINEAR || — || align=right | 4.1 km || 
|-id=633 bgcolor=#E9E9E9
| 207633 ||  || — || September 28, 2006 || Kitt Peak || Spacewatch || — || align=right | 1.8 km || 
|-id=634 bgcolor=#d6d6d6
| 207634 ||  || — || September 30, 2006 || Catalina || CSS || — || align=right | 5.1 km || 
|-id=635 bgcolor=#d6d6d6
| 207635 ||  || — || September 16, 2006 || Kitt Peak || Spacewatch || — || align=right | 4.2 km || 
|-id=636 bgcolor=#d6d6d6
| 207636 ||  || — || September 26, 2006 || Catalina || CSS || SYL7:4 || align=right | 5.0 km || 
|-id=637 bgcolor=#d6d6d6
| 207637 ||  || — || October 12, 2006 || Kitt Peak || Spacewatch || — || align=right | 4.2 km || 
|-id=638 bgcolor=#d6d6d6
| 207638 ||  || — || October 12, 2006 || Kitt Peak || Spacewatch || 3:2 || align=right | 6.1 km || 
|-id=639 bgcolor=#d6d6d6
| 207639 ||  || — || October 2, 2006 || Kitt Peak || Spacewatch || HYG || align=right | 5.5 km || 
|-id=640 bgcolor=#d6d6d6
| 207640 ||  || — || October 16, 2006 || Mount Lemmon || Mount Lemmon Survey || — || align=right | 4.3 km || 
|-id=641 bgcolor=#d6d6d6
| 207641 ||  || — || October 16, 2006 || Kitt Peak || Spacewatch || 3:2 || align=right | 6.5 km || 
|-id=642 bgcolor=#d6d6d6
| 207642 ||  || — || October 16, 2006 || Catalina || CSS || — || align=right | 6.1 km || 
|-id=643 bgcolor=#d6d6d6
| 207643 ||  || — || October 16, 2006 || Catalina || CSS || — || align=right | 5.5 km || 
|-id=644 bgcolor=#d6d6d6
| 207644 ||  || — || October 17, 2006 || Kitt Peak || Spacewatch || 3:2 || align=right | 6.4 km || 
|-id=645 bgcolor=#fefefe
| 207645 ||  || — || April 19, 2007 || Mount Lemmon || Mount Lemmon Survey || — || align=right data-sort-value="0.89" | 890 m || 
|-id=646 bgcolor=#E9E9E9
| 207646 ||  || — || April 20, 2007 || Kitt Peak || Spacewatch || — || align=right | 1.4 km || 
|-id=647 bgcolor=#E9E9E9
| 207647 ||  || — || May 22, 2007 || Siding Spring || SSS || — || align=right | 2.6 km || 
|-id=648 bgcolor=#FA8072
| 207648 ||  || — || June 14, 2007 || Anderson Mesa || LONEOS || — || align=right | 1.4 km || 
|-id=649 bgcolor=#fefefe
| 207649 ||  || — || June 17, 2007 || Kitt Peak || Spacewatch || — || align=right data-sort-value="0.94" | 940 m || 
|-id=650 bgcolor=#E9E9E9
| 207650 ||  || — || June 18, 2007 || Kitt Peak || Spacewatch || — || align=right | 1.6 km || 
|-id=651 bgcolor=#fefefe
| 207651 ||  || — || June 19, 2007 || Kitt Peak || Spacewatch || — || align=right | 1.3 km || 
|-id=652 bgcolor=#fefefe
| 207652 ||  || — || July 18, 2007 || Chante-Perdrix || Chante-Perdrix Obs. || — || align=right | 3.8 km || 
|-id=653 bgcolor=#d6d6d6
| 207653 ||  || — || July 18, 2007 || Andrushivka || Andrushivka Obs. || EUP || align=right | 4.4 km || 
|-id=654 bgcolor=#fefefe
| 207654 ||  || — || July 24, 2007 || Reedy Creek || J. Broughton || MAS || align=right | 1.2 km || 
|-id=655 bgcolor=#fefefe
| 207655 Kerboguan ||  ||  || July 25, 2007 || Lulin Observatory || C.-S. Lin, Q.-z. Ye || — || align=right | 1.1 km || 
|-id=656 bgcolor=#E9E9E9
| 207656 ||  || — || July 25, 2007 || Lulin Observatory || LUSS || — || align=right | 3.6 km || 
|-id=657 bgcolor=#fefefe
| 207657 Mangiantini || 2007 PA ||  || August 1, 2007 || San Marcello || L. Tesi, G. Fagioli || NYS || align=right | 1.0 km || 
|-id=658 bgcolor=#fefefe
| 207658 || 2007 PY || — || August 4, 2007 || Reedy Creek || J. Broughton || MAS || align=right | 1.2 km || 
|-id=659 bgcolor=#fefefe
| 207659 ||  || — || August 6, 2007 || Reedy Creek || J. Broughton || — || align=right | 2.0 km || 
|-id=660 bgcolor=#fefefe
| 207660 ||  || — || August 7, 2007 || Eskridge || Farpoint Obs. || — || align=right | 2.8 km || 
|-id=661 bgcolor=#E9E9E9
| 207661 Hehuanshan ||  ||  || August 6, 2007 || Lulin Observatory || C.-S. Lin, Q.-z. Ye || — || align=right | 3.8 km || 
|-id=662 bgcolor=#fefefe
| 207662 ||  || — || August 5, 2007 || Socorro || LINEAR || NYS || align=right data-sort-value="0.95" | 950 m || 
|-id=663 bgcolor=#fefefe
| 207663 ||  || — || August 9, 2007 || Reedy Creek || J. Broughton || — || align=right | 1.3 km || 
|-id=664 bgcolor=#fefefe
| 207664 ||  || — || August 10, 2007 || Reedy Creek || J. Broughton || MAS || align=right | 1.1 km || 
|-id=665 bgcolor=#fefefe
| 207665 ||  || — || August 10, 2007 || Reedy Creek || J. Broughton || MAS || align=right | 1.3 km || 
|-id=666 bgcolor=#fefefe
| 207666 Habibula ||  ||  || August 11, 2007 || Saint-Sulpice || B. Christophe || V || align=right | 1.0 km || 
|-id=667 bgcolor=#fefefe
| 207667 ||  || — || August 9, 2007 || Socorro || LINEAR || MAS || align=right | 1.3 km || 
|-id=668 bgcolor=#fefefe
| 207668 ||  || — || August 9, 2007 || Socorro || LINEAR || — || align=right | 1.5 km || 
|-id=669 bgcolor=#fefefe
| 207669 ||  || — || August 9, 2007 || Socorro || LINEAR || MAS || align=right | 1.2 km || 
|-id=670 bgcolor=#fefefe
| 207670 ||  || — || August 9, 2007 || Socorro || LINEAR || NYS || align=right data-sort-value="0.81" | 810 m || 
|-id=671 bgcolor=#fefefe
| 207671 ||  || — || August 9, 2007 || Socorro || LINEAR || — || align=right | 2.1 km || 
|-id=672 bgcolor=#fefefe
| 207672 ||  || — || August 10, 2007 || Kitt Peak || Spacewatch || — || align=right | 1.2 km || 
|-id=673 bgcolor=#E9E9E9
| 207673 ||  || — || August 13, 2007 || Socorro || LINEAR || — || align=right | 5.8 km || 
|-id=674 bgcolor=#fefefe
| 207674 ||  || — || August 8, 2007 || Socorro || LINEAR || — || align=right | 1.3 km || 
|-id=675 bgcolor=#fefefe
| 207675 ||  || — || August 9, 2007 || Socorro || LINEAR || MAS || align=right | 1.2 km || 
|-id=676 bgcolor=#fefefe
| 207676 ||  || — || August 9, 2007 || Socorro || LINEAR || NYS || align=right | 1.2 km || 
|-id=677 bgcolor=#fefefe
| 207677 ||  || — || August 13, 2007 || Socorro || LINEAR || — || align=right | 1.0 km || 
|-id=678 bgcolor=#E9E9E9
| 207678 ||  || — || August 11, 2007 || Anderson Mesa || LONEOS || — || align=right | 1.3 km || 
|-id=679 bgcolor=#fefefe
| 207679 ||  || — || August 9, 2007 || Socorro || LINEAR || V || align=right data-sort-value="0.89" | 890 m || 
|-id=680 bgcolor=#E9E9E9
| 207680 ||  || — || August 10, 2007 || Kitt Peak || Spacewatch || KON || align=right | 2.9 km || 
|-id=681 bgcolor=#fefefe
| 207681 Caiqiao || 2007 QO ||  || August 16, 2007 || XuYi || PMO NEO || — || align=right | 2.7 km || 
|-id=682 bgcolor=#fefefe
| 207682 || 2007 QX || — || August 17, 2007 || Bisei SG Center || BATTeRS || V || align=right | 1.2 km || 
|-id=683 bgcolor=#E9E9E9
| 207683 ||  || — || August 23, 2007 || Kitt Peak || Spacewatch || MRX || align=right | 1.4 km || 
|-id=684 bgcolor=#d6d6d6
| 207684 ||  || — || August 16, 2007 || Cerro Burek || Alianza S4 Obs. || — || align=right | 5.7 km || 
|-id=685 bgcolor=#E9E9E9
| 207685 ||  || — || August 23, 2007 || Kitt Peak || Spacewatch || — || align=right | 2.4 km || 
|-id=686 bgcolor=#fefefe
| 207686 ||  || — || September 3, 2007 || Catalina || CSS || MAS || align=right | 1.1 km || 
|-id=687 bgcolor=#fefefe
| 207687 Senckenberg ||  ||  || September 12, 2007 || Taunus || E. Schwab, R. Kling || — || align=right | 1.4 km || 
|-id=688 bgcolor=#fefefe
| 207688 ||  || — || September 11, 2007 || Goodricke-Pigott || R. A. Tucker || NYS || align=right | 1.1 km || 
|-id=689 bgcolor=#d6d6d6
| 207689 ||  || — || September 12, 2007 || Chante-Perdrix || Chante-Perdrix Obs. || — || align=right | 5.5 km || 
|-id=690 bgcolor=#d6d6d6
| 207690 ||  || — || September 14, 2007 || Wrightwood || J. W. Young || KAR || align=right | 1.4 km || 
|-id=691 bgcolor=#fefefe
| 207691 ||  || — || September 3, 2007 || Catalina || CSS || V || align=right data-sort-value="0.98" | 980 m || 
|-id=692 bgcolor=#fefefe
| 207692 ||  || — || September 4, 2007 || Catalina || CSS || V || align=right | 1.0 km || 
|-id=693 bgcolor=#d6d6d6
| 207693 ||  || — || September 5, 2007 || Anderson Mesa || LONEOS || — || align=right | 4.1 km || 
|-id=694 bgcolor=#E9E9E9
| 207694 ||  || — || September 8, 2007 || Anderson Mesa || LONEOS || — || align=right | 3.5 km || 
|-id=695 bgcolor=#fefefe
| 207695 Olgakopyl ||  ||  || September 8, 2007 || Andrushivka || Andrushivka Obs. || — || align=right | 1.2 km || 
|-id=696 bgcolor=#E9E9E9
| 207696 ||  || — || September 9, 2007 || Kitt Peak || Spacewatch || — || align=right | 3.8 km || 
|-id=697 bgcolor=#E9E9E9
| 207697 ||  || — || September 9, 2007 || Anderson Mesa || LONEOS || — || align=right | 2.8 km || 
|-id=698 bgcolor=#E9E9E9
| 207698 ||  || — || September 9, 2007 || Anderson Mesa || LONEOS || AEO || align=right | 1.7 km || 
|-id=699 bgcolor=#fefefe
| 207699 ||  || — || September 10, 2007 || Kitt Peak || Spacewatch || NYS || align=right data-sort-value="0.96" | 960 m || 
|-id=700 bgcolor=#E9E9E9
| 207700 ||  || — || September 10, 2007 || Kitt Peak || Spacewatch || — || align=right | 4.4 km || 
|}

207701–207800 

|-bgcolor=#d6d6d6
| 207701 ||  || — || September 10, 2007 || Kitt Peak || Spacewatch || THM || align=right | 2.9 km || 
|-id=702 bgcolor=#fefefe
| 207702 ||  || — || September 10, 2007 || Kitt Peak || Spacewatch || NYS || align=right | 1.2 km || 
|-id=703 bgcolor=#fefefe
| 207703 ||  || — || September 10, 2007 || Mount Lemmon || Mount Lemmon Survey || — || align=right | 1.2 km || 
|-id=704 bgcolor=#fefefe
| 207704 ||  || — || September 10, 2007 || Mount Lemmon || Mount Lemmon Survey || — || align=right | 1.1 km || 
|-id=705 bgcolor=#E9E9E9
| 207705 ||  || — || September 10, 2007 || Catalina || CSS || — || align=right | 1.2 km || 
|-id=706 bgcolor=#E9E9E9
| 207706 ||  || — || September 10, 2007 || Mount Lemmon || Mount Lemmon Survey || — || align=right | 1.9 km || 
|-id=707 bgcolor=#d6d6d6
| 207707 ||  || — || September 10, 2007 || Kitt Peak || Spacewatch || — || align=right | 2.6 km || 
|-id=708 bgcolor=#d6d6d6
| 207708 ||  || — || September 10, 2007 || Kitt Peak || Spacewatch || — || align=right | 3.0 km || 
|-id=709 bgcolor=#fefefe
| 207709 ||  || — || September 10, 2007 || Kitt Peak || Spacewatch || — || align=right | 1.1 km || 
|-id=710 bgcolor=#fefefe
| 207710 ||  || — || September 11, 2007 || Mount Lemmon || Mount Lemmon Survey || — || align=right data-sort-value="0.89" | 890 m || 
|-id=711 bgcolor=#fefefe
| 207711 ||  || — || September 11, 2007 || Mount Lemmon || Mount Lemmon Survey || — || align=right | 1.4 km || 
|-id=712 bgcolor=#E9E9E9
| 207712 ||  || — || September 11, 2007 || Catalina || CSS || — || align=right | 2.0 km || 
|-id=713 bgcolor=#fefefe
| 207713 ||  || — || September 11, 2007 || Kitt Peak || Spacewatch || NYS || align=right data-sort-value="0.94" | 940 m || 
|-id=714 bgcolor=#E9E9E9
| 207714 ||  || — || September 11, 2007 || Mount Lemmon || Mount Lemmon Survey || — || align=right | 1.9 km || 
|-id=715 bgcolor=#fefefe
| 207715 Muqinshuijiao ||  ||  || September 11, 2007 || XuYi || PMO NEO || — || align=right | 1.2 km || 
|-id=716 bgcolor=#fefefe
| 207716 Wangxichan ||  ||  || September 11, 2007 || XuYi || PMO NEO || MAS || align=right | 1.0 km || 
|-id=717 bgcolor=#d6d6d6
| 207717 Sa'a ||  ||  || September 11, 2007 || Lulin Observatory || Q.-z. Ye, H.-C. Lin || THM || align=right | 3.3 km || 
|-id=718 bgcolor=#E9E9E9
| 207718 ||  || — || September 12, 2007 || Catalina || CSS || — || align=right | 3.8 km || 
|-id=719 bgcolor=#d6d6d6
| 207719 ||  || — || September 12, 2007 || Mount Lemmon || Mount Lemmon Survey || EOS || align=right | 2.7 km || 
|-id=720 bgcolor=#fefefe
| 207720 ||  || — || September 14, 2007 || Anderson Mesa || LONEOS || NYS || align=right | 1.9 km || 
|-id=721 bgcolor=#E9E9E9
| 207721 ||  || — || September 13, 2007 || Socorro || LINEAR || AEO || align=right | 1.8 km || 
|-id=722 bgcolor=#E9E9E9
| 207722 ||  || — || September 14, 2007 || Socorro || LINEAR || — || align=right | 2.9 km || 
|-id=723 bgcolor=#fefefe
| 207723 Jiansanjiang ||  ||  || September 11, 2007 || XuYi || PMO NEO || — || align=right | 1.2 km || 
|-id=724 bgcolor=#E9E9E9
| 207724 ||  || — || September 12, 2007 || Lulin Observatory || LUSS || — || align=right | 2.5 km || 
|-id=725 bgcolor=#E9E9E9
| 207725 ||  || — || September 8, 2007 || Anderson Mesa || LONEOS || — || align=right | 2.1 km || 
|-id=726 bgcolor=#E9E9E9
| 207726 ||  || — || September 9, 2007 || Anderson Mesa || LONEOS || — || align=right | 3.7 km || 
|-id=727 bgcolor=#E9E9E9
| 207727 ||  || — || September 10, 2007 || Kitt Peak || Spacewatch || — || align=right | 1.4 km || 
|-id=728 bgcolor=#E9E9E9
| 207728 ||  || — || September 10, 2007 || Kitt Peak || Spacewatch || — || align=right | 2.9 km || 
|-id=729 bgcolor=#E9E9E9
| 207729 ||  || — || September 10, 2007 || Kitt Peak || Spacewatch || — || align=right | 1.9 km || 
|-id=730 bgcolor=#d6d6d6
| 207730 ||  || — || September 10, 2007 || Kitt Peak || Spacewatch || EOS || align=right | 2.8 km || 
|-id=731 bgcolor=#E9E9E9
| 207731 ||  || — || September 14, 2007 || Altschwendt || W. Ries || MRX || align=right | 1.1 km || 
|-id=732 bgcolor=#E9E9E9
| 207732 ||  || — || September 11, 2007 || Kitt Peak || Spacewatch || — || align=right | 1.6 km || 
|-id=733 bgcolor=#fefefe
| 207733 ||  || — || September 12, 2007 || Catalina || CSS || — || align=right data-sort-value="0.93" | 930 m || 
|-id=734 bgcolor=#fefefe
| 207734 ||  || — || September 12, 2007 || Catalina || CSS || MAS || align=right | 1.2 km || 
|-id=735 bgcolor=#E9E9E9
| 207735 ||  || — || September 12, 2007 || Kitt Peak || Spacewatch || — || align=right | 2.2 km || 
|-id=736 bgcolor=#E9E9E9
| 207736 ||  || — || September 14, 2007 || Mount Lemmon || Mount Lemmon Survey || — || align=right | 1.6 km || 
|-id=737 bgcolor=#E9E9E9
| 207737 ||  || — || September 14, 2007 || Mount Lemmon || Mount Lemmon Survey || — || align=right | 1.2 km || 
|-id=738 bgcolor=#fefefe
| 207738 ||  || — || September 10, 2007 || Kitt Peak || Spacewatch || — || align=right data-sort-value="0.74" | 740 m || 
|-id=739 bgcolor=#E9E9E9
| 207739 ||  || — || September 13, 2007 || Mount Lemmon || Mount Lemmon Survey || — || align=right | 2.4 km || 
|-id=740 bgcolor=#fefefe
| 207740 ||  || — || September 14, 2007 || Kitt Peak || Spacewatch || — || align=right data-sort-value="0.96" | 960 m || 
|-id=741 bgcolor=#d6d6d6
| 207741 ||  || — || September 11, 2007 || Kitt Peak || Spacewatch || — || align=right | 3.9 km || 
|-id=742 bgcolor=#E9E9E9
| 207742 ||  || — || September 11, 2007 || Kitt Peak || Spacewatch || — || align=right | 2.7 km || 
|-id=743 bgcolor=#d6d6d6
| 207743 ||  || — || September 13, 2007 || Catalina || CSS || — || align=right | 7.0 km || 
|-id=744 bgcolor=#d6d6d6
| 207744 ||  || — || September 13, 2007 || Anderson Mesa || LONEOS || — || align=right | 3.4 km || 
|-id=745 bgcolor=#E9E9E9
| 207745 ||  || — || September 13, 2007 || Catalina || CSS || — || align=right | 5.0 km || 
|-id=746 bgcolor=#fefefe
| 207746 ||  || — || September 14, 2007 || Catalina || CSS || — || align=right | 1.7 km || 
|-id=747 bgcolor=#fefefe
| 207747 ||  || — || September 14, 2007 || Catalina || CSS || V || align=right | 1.2 km || 
|-id=748 bgcolor=#E9E9E9
| 207748 ||  || — || September 5, 2007 || Anderson Mesa || LONEOS || — || align=right | 2.9 km || 
|-id=749 bgcolor=#C2FFFF
| 207749 ||  || — || September 2, 2007 || Mount Lemmon || Mount Lemmon Survey || L4 || align=right | 21 km || 
|-id=750 bgcolor=#d6d6d6
| 207750 ||  || — || September 13, 2007 || Catalina || CSS || BRA || align=right | 2.5 km || 
|-id=751 bgcolor=#d6d6d6
| 207751 ||  || — || September 14, 2007 || Mount Lemmon || Mount Lemmon Survey || KAR || align=right | 1.2 km || 
|-id=752 bgcolor=#fefefe
| 207752 ||  || — || September 5, 2007 || Catalina || CSS || — || align=right | 1.4 km || 
|-id=753 bgcolor=#d6d6d6
| 207753 ||  || — || September 18, 2007 || OAM || OAM Obs. || — || align=right | 4.1 km || 
|-id=754 bgcolor=#fefefe
| 207754 Stathiskafalis ||  ||  || September 21, 2007 || Altschwendt || W. Ries || — || align=right data-sort-value="0.94" | 940 m || 
|-id=755 bgcolor=#E9E9E9
| 207755 ||  || — || September 17, 2007 || XuYi || PMO NEO || — || align=right | 2.2 km || 
|-id=756 bgcolor=#d6d6d6
| 207756 ||  || — || September 20, 2007 || Črni Vrh || Črni Vrh || ALA || align=right | 3.9 km || 
|-id=757 bgcolor=#E9E9E9
| 207757 ||  || — || September 25, 2007 || Mount Lemmon || Mount Lemmon Survey || — || align=right | 4.5 km || 
|-id=758 bgcolor=#d6d6d6
| 207758 ||  || — || September 23, 2007 || Bergisch Gladbach || W. Bickel || KAR || align=right | 1.7 km || 
|-id=759 bgcolor=#d6d6d6
| 207759 ||  || — || October 3, 2007 || Tiki || N. Teamo, J.-C. Pelle || — || align=right | 4.2 km || 
|-id=760 bgcolor=#d6d6d6
| 207760 ||  || — || October 5, 2007 || Prairie Grass || Prairie Grass Obs. || KOR || align=right | 1.8 km || 
|-id=761 bgcolor=#E9E9E9
| 207761 ||  || — || October 6, 2007 || 7300 Observatory || W. K. Y. Yeung || — || align=right | 2.3 km || 
|-id=762 bgcolor=#d6d6d6
| 207762 ||  || — || October 6, 2007 || Socorro || LINEAR || HYG || align=right | 4.2 km || 
|-id=763 bgcolor=#d6d6d6
| 207763 Oberursel ||  ||  || October 6, 2007 || Taunus || R. Kling, U. Zimmer || — || align=right | 3.2 km || 
|-id=764 bgcolor=#d6d6d6
| 207764 ||  || — || October 10, 2007 || OAM] || OAM Obs. || EOS || align=right | 3.0 km || 
|-id=765 bgcolor=#E9E9E9
| 207765 ||  || — || October 6, 2007 || Kitt Peak || Spacewatch || AGN || align=right | 2.0 km || 
|-id=766 bgcolor=#E9E9E9
| 207766 ||  || — || October 6, 2007 || Kitt Peak || Spacewatch || HEN || align=right | 1.3 km || 
|-id=767 bgcolor=#E9E9E9
| 207767 ||  || — || October 6, 2007 || Kitt Peak || Spacewatch || — || align=right | 2.1 km || 
|-id=768 bgcolor=#d6d6d6
| 207768 ||  || — || October 6, 2007 || Kitt Peak || Spacewatch || KOR || align=right | 4.5 km || 
|-id=769 bgcolor=#fefefe
| 207769 ||  || — || October 4, 2007 || Catalina || CSS || NYS || align=right data-sort-value="0.92" | 920 m || 
|-id=770 bgcolor=#fefefe
| 207770 ||  || — || October 4, 2007 || Catalina || CSS || — || align=right data-sort-value="0.87" | 870 m || 
|-id=771 bgcolor=#E9E9E9
| 207771 ||  || — || October 6, 2007 || Kitt Peak || Spacewatch || — || align=right | 1.3 km || 
|-id=772 bgcolor=#d6d6d6
| 207772 ||  || — || October 4, 2007 || Kitt Peak || Spacewatch || HYG || align=right | 3.9 km || 
|-id=773 bgcolor=#d6d6d6
| 207773 ||  || — || October 5, 2007 || Kitt Peak || Spacewatch || 3:2 || align=right | 5.1 km || 
|-id=774 bgcolor=#d6d6d6
| 207774 ||  || — || October 12, 2007 || Chante-Perdrix || Chante-Perdrix Obs. || — || align=right | 3.4 km || 
|-id=775 bgcolor=#d6d6d6
| 207775 ||  || — || October 13, 2007 || Goodricke-Pigott || R. A. Tucker || — || align=right | 5.0 km || 
|-id=776 bgcolor=#d6d6d6
| 207776 ||  || — || October 13, 2007 || 7300 Observatory || W. K. Y. Yeung || KOR || align=right | 2.1 km || 
|-id=777 bgcolor=#d6d6d6
| 207777 ||  || — || October 5, 2007 || Kitt Peak || Spacewatch || KOR || align=right | 2.0 km || 
|-id=778 bgcolor=#d6d6d6
| 207778 ||  || — || October 5, 2007 || Kitt Peak || Spacewatch || HYG || align=right | 4.9 km || 
|-id=779 bgcolor=#fefefe
| 207779 ||  || — || October 8, 2007 || Catalina || CSS || PHO || align=right | 1.9 km || 
|-id=780 bgcolor=#E9E9E9
| 207780 ||  || — || October 8, 2007 || Mount Lemmon || Mount Lemmon Survey || — || align=right | 3.8 km || 
|-id=781 bgcolor=#d6d6d6
| 207781 ||  || — || October 8, 2007 || Mount Lemmon || Mount Lemmon Survey || KOR || align=right | 2.0 km || 
|-id=782 bgcolor=#fefefe
| 207782 ||  || — || October 8, 2007 || Mount Lemmon || Mount Lemmon Survey || FLO || align=right | 1.1 km || 
|-id=783 bgcolor=#d6d6d6
| 207783 ||  || — || October 11, 2007 || Taunus || Taunus Obs. || — || align=right | 4.8 km || 
|-id=784 bgcolor=#d6d6d6
| 207784 ||  || — || October 9, 2007 || Kitt Peak || Spacewatch || — || align=right | 4.1 km || 
|-id=785 bgcolor=#d6d6d6
| 207785 ||  || — || October 6, 2007 || Kitt Peak || Spacewatch || — || align=right | 4.0 km || 
|-id=786 bgcolor=#d6d6d6
| 207786 ||  || — || October 7, 2007 || Kitt Peak || Spacewatch || EOS || align=right | 2.9 km || 
|-id=787 bgcolor=#fefefe
| 207787 ||  || — || October 7, 2007 || Catalina || CSS || FLO || align=right data-sort-value="0.97" | 970 m || 
|-id=788 bgcolor=#d6d6d6
| 207788 ||  || — || October 7, 2007 || Mount Lemmon || Mount Lemmon Survey || — || align=right | 4.6 km || 
|-id=789 bgcolor=#d6d6d6
| 207789 ||  || — || October 6, 2007 || Socorro || LINEAR || HYG || align=right | 5.0 km || 
|-id=790 bgcolor=#d6d6d6
| 207790 ||  || — || October 7, 2007 || Socorro || LINEAR || — || align=right | 4.2 km || 
|-id=791 bgcolor=#E9E9E9
| 207791 ||  || — || October 9, 2007 || Socorro || LINEAR || — || align=right | 3.7 km || 
|-id=792 bgcolor=#E9E9E9
| 207792 ||  || — || October 9, 2007 || Socorro || LINEAR || — || align=right | 2.8 km || 
|-id=793 bgcolor=#d6d6d6
| 207793 ||  || — || October 11, 2007 || Socorro || LINEAR || — || align=right | 3.3 km || 
|-id=794 bgcolor=#E9E9E9
| 207794 ||  || — || October 12, 2007 || Socorro || LINEAR || — || align=right | 2.2 km || 
|-id=795 bgcolor=#E9E9E9
| 207795 ||  || — || October 12, 2007 || Socorro || LINEAR || — || align=right | 3.2 km || 
|-id=796 bgcolor=#E9E9E9
| 207796 ||  || — || October 12, 2007 || Chante-Perdrix || Chante-Perdrix Obs. || HEN || align=right | 1.4 km || 
|-id=797 bgcolor=#d6d6d6
| 207797 ||  || — || October 13, 2007 || Socorro || LINEAR || — || align=right | 4.9 km || 
|-id=798 bgcolor=#E9E9E9
| 207798 ||  || — || October 4, 2007 || Mount Lemmon || Mount Lemmon Survey || — || align=right | 1.4 km || 
|-id=799 bgcolor=#E9E9E9
| 207799 ||  || — || October 6, 2007 || Kitt Peak || Spacewatch || — || align=right | 2.8 km || 
|-id=800 bgcolor=#d6d6d6
| 207800 ||  || — || October 7, 2007 || Mount Lemmon || Mount Lemmon Survey || — || align=right | 4.0 km || 
|}

207801–207900 

|-bgcolor=#d6d6d6
| 207801 ||  || — || October 7, 2007 || Kitt Peak || Spacewatch || 3:2 || align=right | 4.2 km || 
|-id=802 bgcolor=#d6d6d6
| 207802 ||  || — || October 7, 2007 || Catalina || CSS || — || align=right | 7.1 km || 
|-id=803 bgcolor=#fefefe
| 207803 ||  || — || October 7, 2007 || Kitt Peak || Spacewatch || FLO || align=right data-sort-value="0.98" | 980 m || 
|-id=804 bgcolor=#d6d6d6
| 207804 ||  || — || October 8, 2007 || Kitt Peak || Spacewatch || KOR || align=right | 1.6 km || 
|-id=805 bgcolor=#d6d6d6
| 207805 ||  || — || October 9, 2007 || Mount Lemmon || Mount Lemmon Survey || — || align=right | 3.5 km || 
|-id=806 bgcolor=#fefefe
| 207806 ||  || — || October 10, 2007 || Kitt Peak || Spacewatch || V || align=right | 1.0 km || 
|-id=807 bgcolor=#fefefe
| 207807 ||  || — || October 8, 2007 || Catalina || CSS || — || align=right | 1.1 km || 
|-id=808 bgcolor=#d6d6d6
| 207808 ||  || — || October 8, 2007 || Catalina || CSS || — || align=right | 2.8 km || 
|-id=809 bgcolor=#d6d6d6
| 207809 Wuzuze ||  ||  || October 9, 2007 || XuYi || PMO NEO || EOS || align=right | 3.5 km || 
|-id=810 bgcolor=#d6d6d6
| 207810 ||  || — || October 10, 2007 || Anderson Mesa || LONEOS || EOS || align=right | 3.4 km || 
|-id=811 bgcolor=#E9E9E9
| 207811 ||  || — || October 12, 2007 || Anderson Mesa || LONEOS || — || align=right | 2.0 km || 
|-id=812 bgcolor=#d6d6d6
| 207812 ||  || — || October 7, 2007 || Catalina || CSS || — || align=right | 3.4 km || 
|-id=813 bgcolor=#fefefe
| 207813 ||  || — || October 7, 2007 || Mount Lemmon || Mount Lemmon Survey || NYS || align=right | 1.1 km || 
|-id=814 bgcolor=#E9E9E9
| 207814 ||  || — || October 8, 2007 || Mount Lemmon || Mount Lemmon Survey || AST || align=right | 2.9 km || 
|-id=815 bgcolor=#d6d6d6
| 207815 ||  || — || October 10, 2007 || Kitt Peak || Spacewatch || — || align=right | 3.4 km || 
|-id=816 bgcolor=#d6d6d6
| 207816 ||  || — || October 10, 2007 || Kitt Peak || Spacewatch || KOR || align=right | 1.5 km || 
|-id=817 bgcolor=#E9E9E9
| 207817 ||  || — || October 10, 2007 || Kitt Peak || Spacewatch || — || align=right | 1.9 km || 
|-id=818 bgcolor=#d6d6d6
| 207818 ||  || — || October 9, 2007 || Kitt Peak || Spacewatch || — || align=right | 3.5 km || 
|-id=819 bgcolor=#E9E9E9
| 207819 ||  || — || October 11, 2007 || Catalina || CSS || — || align=right | 2.7 km || 
|-id=820 bgcolor=#E9E9E9
| 207820 ||  || — || October 12, 2007 || Kitt Peak || Spacewatch || MRX || align=right | 1.7 km || 
|-id=821 bgcolor=#E9E9E9
| 207821 ||  || — || October 11, 2007 || Kitt Peak || Spacewatch || — || align=right | 1.8 km || 
|-id=822 bgcolor=#E9E9E9
| 207822 ||  || — || October 12, 2007 || Kitt Peak || Spacewatch || — || align=right | 1.8 km || 
|-id=823 bgcolor=#d6d6d6
| 207823 ||  || — || October 9, 2007 || Mount Lemmon || Mount Lemmon Survey || KOR || align=right | 1.6 km || 
|-id=824 bgcolor=#d6d6d6
| 207824 ||  || — || October 8, 2007 || Mount Lemmon || Mount Lemmon Survey || — || align=right | 2.8 km || 
|-id=825 bgcolor=#E9E9E9
| 207825 ||  || — || October 10, 2007 || Catalina || CSS || — || align=right | 3.6 km || 
|-id=826 bgcolor=#fefefe
| 207826 ||  || — || October 12, 2007 || Catalina || CSS || — || align=right | 1.4 km || 
|-id=827 bgcolor=#d6d6d6
| 207827 ||  || — || October 14, 2007 || Mount Lemmon || Mount Lemmon Survey || Tj (2.95) || align=right | 5.3 km || 
|-id=828 bgcolor=#E9E9E9
| 207828 ||  || — || October 15, 2007 || Goodricke-Pigott || R. A. Tucker || — || align=right | 2.2 km || 
|-id=829 bgcolor=#E9E9E9
| 207829 ||  || — || October 14, 2007 || Kitt Peak || Spacewatch || — || align=right | 1.6 km || 
|-id=830 bgcolor=#E9E9E9
| 207830 ||  || — || October 14, 2007 || Kitt Peak || Spacewatch || — || align=right | 1.7 km || 
|-id=831 bgcolor=#d6d6d6
| 207831 ||  || — || October 14, 2007 || Kitt Peak || Spacewatch || KOR || align=right | 1.8 km || 
|-id=832 bgcolor=#d6d6d6
| 207832 ||  || — || October 15, 2007 || Catalina || CSS || — || align=right | 3.4 km || 
|-id=833 bgcolor=#E9E9E9
| 207833 ||  || — || October 4, 2007 || Kitt Peak || Spacewatch || — || align=right | 1.3 km || 
|-id=834 bgcolor=#E9E9E9
| 207834 ||  || — || October 7, 2007 || Catalina || CSS || — || align=right | 1.5 km || 
|-id=835 bgcolor=#d6d6d6
| 207835 ||  || — || October 16, 2007 || Catalina || CSS || — || align=right | 6.1 km || 
|-id=836 bgcolor=#E9E9E9
| 207836 ||  || — || October 17, 2007 || Anderson Mesa || LONEOS || MRX || align=right | 1.3 km || 
|-id=837 bgcolor=#d6d6d6
| 207837 ||  || — || October 16, 2007 || Kitt Peak || Spacewatch || — || align=right | 3.3 km || 
|-id=838 bgcolor=#E9E9E9
| 207838 ||  || — || October 19, 2007 || Catalina || CSS || — || align=right | 1.2 km || 
|-id=839 bgcolor=#d6d6d6
| 207839 ||  || — || October 16, 2007 || Siding Spring || SSS || EUP || align=right | 5.8 km || 
|-id=840 bgcolor=#d6d6d6
| 207840 ||  || — || October 30, 2007 || Kitt Peak || Spacewatch || — || align=right | 4.0 km || 
|-id=841 bgcolor=#d6d6d6
| 207841 ||  || — || October 30, 2007 || Kitt Peak || Spacewatch || — || align=right | 6.1 km || 
|-id=842 bgcolor=#d6d6d6
| 207842 ||  || — || October 30, 2007 || Mount Lemmon || Mount Lemmon Survey || — || align=right | 3.2 km || 
|-id=843 bgcolor=#fefefe
| 207843 ||  || — || October 30, 2007 || Kitt Peak || Spacewatch || V || align=right data-sort-value="0.92" | 920 m || 
|-id=844 bgcolor=#d6d6d6
| 207844 ||  || — || October 30, 2007 || Mount Lemmon || Mount Lemmon Survey || THM || align=right | 4.0 km || 
|-id=845 bgcolor=#E9E9E9
| 207845 ||  || — || October 30, 2007 || Kitt Peak || Spacewatch || AGN || align=right | 1.4 km || 
|-id=846 bgcolor=#E9E9E9
| 207846 ||  || — || October 30, 2007 || Kitt Peak || Spacewatch || — || align=right | 2.4 km || 
|-id=847 bgcolor=#E9E9E9
| 207847 ||  || — || October 31, 2007 || Kitt Peak || Spacewatch || AGN || align=right | 1.8 km || 
|-id=848 bgcolor=#d6d6d6
| 207848 ||  || — || October 30, 2007 || Catalina || CSS || — || align=right | 4.3 km || 
|-id=849 bgcolor=#d6d6d6
| 207849 ||  || — || October 30, 2007 || Mount Lemmon || Mount Lemmon Survey || KOR || align=right | 1.5 km || 
|-id=850 bgcolor=#E9E9E9
| 207850 ||  || — || October 30, 2007 || Mount Lemmon || Mount Lemmon Survey || WIT || align=right | 1.2 km || 
|-id=851 bgcolor=#E9E9E9
| 207851 ||  || — || October 30, 2007 || Mount Lemmon || Mount Lemmon Survey || — || align=right | 1.3 km || 
|-id=852 bgcolor=#d6d6d6
| 207852 ||  || — || October 31, 2007 || Catalina || CSS || — || align=right | 5.6 km || 
|-id=853 bgcolor=#d6d6d6
| 207853 ||  || — || October 30, 2007 || Kitt Peak || Spacewatch || 3:2 || align=right | 5.0 km || 
|-id=854 bgcolor=#d6d6d6
| 207854 ||  || — || November 2, 2007 || Mount Lemmon || Mount Lemmon Survey || — || align=right | 2.6 km || 
|-id=855 bgcolor=#E9E9E9
| 207855 ||  || — || November 3, 2007 || Catalina || CSS || — || align=right | 2.3 km || 
|-id=856 bgcolor=#d6d6d6
| 207856 ||  || — || November 1, 2007 || Kitt Peak || Spacewatch || — || align=right | 2.9 km || 
|-id=857 bgcolor=#d6d6d6
| 207857 ||  || — || November 5, 2007 || Socorro || LINEAR || KOR || align=right | 1.9 km || 
|-id=858 bgcolor=#E9E9E9
| 207858 ||  || — || November 3, 2007 || Kitt Peak || Spacewatch || — || align=right | 3.0 km || 
|-id=859 bgcolor=#d6d6d6
| 207859 ||  || — || November 3, 2007 || Kitt Peak || Spacewatch || THM || align=right | 3.4 km || 
|-id=860 bgcolor=#d6d6d6
| 207860 ||  || — || November 4, 2007 || Kitt Peak || Spacewatch || — || align=right | 3.9 km || 
|-id=861 bgcolor=#E9E9E9
| 207861 ||  || — || November 5, 2007 || Kitt Peak || Spacewatch || — || align=right | 2.7 km || 
|-id=862 bgcolor=#E9E9E9
| 207862 ||  || — || November 5, 2007 || Kitt Peak || Spacewatch || — || align=right | 3.3 km || 
|-id=863 bgcolor=#E9E9E9
| 207863 ||  || — || November 1, 2007 || Mount Lemmon || Mount Lemmon Survey || — || align=right | 1.6 km || 
|-id=864 bgcolor=#d6d6d6
| 207864 ||  || — || November 2, 2007 || Kitt Peak || Spacewatch || THM || align=right | 3.4 km || 
|-id=865 bgcolor=#fefefe
| 207865 ||  || — || November 4, 2007 || Kitt Peak || Spacewatch || NYS || align=right | 1.2 km || 
|-id=866 bgcolor=#d6d6d6
| 207866 ||  || — || November 5, 2007 || Kitt Peak || Spacewatch || — || align=right | 4.5 km || 
|-id=867 bgcolor=#d6d6d6
| 207867 ||  || — || November 2, 2007 || Mount Lemmon || Mount Lemmon Survey || — || align=right | 4.8 km || 
|-id=868 bgcolor=#d6d6d6
| 207868 ||  || — || November 4, 2007 || Mount Lemmon || Mount Lemmon Survey || — || align=right | 4.3 km || 
|-id=869 bgcolor=#d6d6d6
| 207869 ||  || — || November 5, 2007 || Kitt Peak || Spacewatch || — || align=right | 3.3 km || 
|-id=870 bgcolor=#d6d6d6
| 207870 ||  || — || November 9, 2007 || Kitt Peak || Spacewatch || — || align=right | 3.2 km || 
|-id=871 bgcolor=#E9E9E9
| 207871 ||  || — || November 9, 2007 || Kitt Peak || Spacewatch || — || align=right | 2.8 km || 
|-id=872 bgcolor=#E9E9E9
| 207872 ||  || — || November 14, 2007 || Bisei SG Center || BATTeRS || AGN || align=right | 1.6 km || 
|-id=873 bgcolor=#d6d6d6
| 207873 ||  || — || November 15, 2007 || Mount Lemmon || Mount Lemmon Survey || — || align=right | 6.4 km || 
|-id=874 bgcolor=#d6d6d6
| 207874 ||  || — || November 13, 2007 || Anderson Mesa || LONEOS || — || align=right | 5.7 km || 
|-id=875 bgcolor=#E9E9E9
| 207875 ||  || — || November 11, 2007 || Catalina || CSS || — || align=right | 2.3 km || 
|-id=876 bgcolor=#d6d6d6
| 207876 ||  || — || November 11, 2007 || Catalina || CSS || ELF || align=right | 4.5 km || 
|-id=877 bgcolor=#fefefe
| 207877 ||  || — || November 14, 2007 || Eskridge || Farpoint Obs. || — || align=right | 1.1 km || 
|-id=878 bgcolor=#d6d6d6
| 207878 ||  || — || November 14, 2007 || Kitt Peak || Spacewatch || — || align=right | 3.9 km || 
|-id=879 bgcolor=#d6d6d6
| 207879 ||  || — || November 5, 2007 || Kitt Peak || Spacewatch || KOR || align=right | 1.8 km || 
|-id=880 bgcolor=#fefefe
| 207880 ||  || — || November 5, 2007 || Mount Lemmon || Mount Lemmon Survey || — || align=right | 1.1 km || 
|-id=881 bgcolor=#E9E9E9
| 207881 ||  || — || November 2, 2007 || Mount Lemmon || Mount Lemmon Survey || PAD || align=right | 2.6 km || 
|-id=882 bgcolor=#d6d6d6
| 207882 ||  || — || November 3, 2007 || Kitt Peak || Spacewatch || KOR || align=right | 1.7 km || 
|-id=883 bgcolor=#d6d6d6
| 207883 || 2007 WN || — || November 16, 2007 || La Cañada || J. Lacruz || THM || align=right | 3.0 km || 
|-id=884 bgcolor=#d6d6d6
| 207884 ||  || — || November 20, 2007 || Mount Lemmon || Mount Lemmon Survey || KOR || align=right | 1.9 km || 
|-id=885 bgcolor=#E9E9E9
| 207885 ||  || — || November 20, 2007 || Mount Lemmon || Mount Lemmon Survey || — || align=right | 2.8 km || 
|-id=886 bgcolor=#d6d6d6
| 207886 ||  || — || December 5, 2007 || OAM || OAM Obs. || — || align=right | 5.6 km || 
|-id=887 bgcolor=#E9E9E9
| 207887 ||  || — || December 4, 2007 || Kanab || E. E. Sheridan || AGN || align=right | 1.7 km || 
|-id=888 bgcolor=#d6d6d6
| 207888 ||  || — || December 28, 2007 || Kitt Peak || Spacewatch || KOR || align=right | 1.9 km || 
|-id=889 bgcolor=#E9E9E9
| 207889 ||  || — || January 10, 2008 || Mount Lemmon || Mount Lemmon Survey || — || align=right | 4.0 km || 
|-id=890 bgcolor=#d6d6d6
| 207890 ||  || — || February 8, 2008 || Mount Lemmon || Mount Lemmon Survey || ALA || align=right | 7.6 km || 
|-id=891 bgcolor=#fefefe
| 207891 ||  || — || September 3, 2008 || Kitt Peak || Spacewatch || MAS || align=right data-sort-value="0.98" | 980 m || 
|-id=892 bgcolor=#C2FFFF
| 207892 ||  || — || September 24, 2008 || Kitt Peak || Spacewatch || L4 || align=right | 15 km || 
|-id=893 bgcolor=#d6d6d6
| 207893 ||  || — || September 24, 2008 || Mount Lemmon || Mount Lemmon Survey || — || align=right | 3.0 km || 
|-id=894 bgcolor=#fefefe
| 207894 ||  || — || October 1, 2008 || Mount Lemmon || Mount Lemmon Survey || NYS || align=right data-sort-value="0.88" | 880 m || 
|-id=895 bgcolor=#d6d6d6
| 207895 ||  || — || October 2, 2008 || Kitt Peak || Spacewatch || — || align=right | 3.2 km || 
|-id=896 bgcolor=#d6d6d6
| 207896 ||  || — || October 6, 2008 || Kitt Peak || Spacewatch || — || align=right | 2.7 km || 
|-id=897 bgcolor=#E9E9E9
| 207897 ||  || — || October 6, 2008 || Kitt Peak || Spacewatch || — || align=right | 2.3 km || 
|-id=898 bgcolor=#E9E9E9
| 207898 ||  || — || October 22, 2008 || Socorro || LINEAR || — || align=right | 3.9 km || 
|-id=899 bgcolor=#d6d6d6
| 207899 Grinmalia ||  ||  || October 21, 2008 || Andrushivka || Andrushivka Obs. || — || align=right | 4.6 km || 
|-id=900 bgcolor=#E9E9E9
| 207900 ||  || — || October 21, 2008 || Mount Lemmon || Mount Lemmon Survey || — || align=right | 3.0 km || 
|}

207901–208000 

|-bgcolor=#d6d6d6
| 207901 Tzecmaun ||  ||  || October 28, 2008 || Tzec Maun || E. Schwab || EMA || align=right | 5.1 km || 
|-id=902 bgcolor=#fefefe
| 207902 ||  || — || October 22, 2008 || Kitt Peak || Spacewatch || — || align=right | 1.3 km || 
|-id=903 bgcolor=#E9E9E9
| 207903 ||  || — || October 24, 2008 || Kitt Peak || Spacewatch || — || align=right | 2.7 km || 
|-id=904 bgcolor=#E9E9E9
| 207904 ||  || — || October 24, 2008 || Mount Lemmon || Mount Lemmon Survey || — || align=right data-sort-value="0.94" | 940 m || 
|-id=905 bgcolor=#d6d6d6
| 207905 ||  || — || October 24, 2008 || Kitt Peak || Spacewatch || — || align=right | 3.3 km || 
|-id=906 bgcolor=#E9E9E9
| 207906 ||  || — || October 28, 2008 || Socorro || LINEAR || EUN || align=right | 2.7 km || 
|-id=907 bgcolor=#E9E9E9
| 207907 ||  || — || October 27, 2008 || Kitt Peak || Spacewatch || — || align=right | 3.9 km || 
|-id=908 bgcolor=#fefefe
| 207908 ||  || — || October 27, 2008 || Kitt Peak || Spacewatch || NYS || align=right data-sort-value="0.91" | 910 m || 
|-id=909 bgcolor=#d6d6d6
| 207909 ||  || — || October 28, 2008 || Mount Lemmon || Mount Lemmon Survey || THM || align=right | 3.9 km || 
|-id=910 bgcolor=#fefefe
| 207910 ||  || — || October 29, 2008 || Kitt Peak || Spacewatch || FLO || align=right data-sort-value="0.66" | 660 m || 
|-id=911 bgcolor=#E9E9E9
| 207911 ||  || — || October 29, 2008 || Kitt Peak || Spacewatch || AGN || align=right | 2.4 km || 
|-id=912 bgcolor=#E9E9E9
| 207912 ||  || — || October 30, 2008 || Kitt Peak || Spacewatch || — || align=right | 4.0 km || 
|-id=913 bgcolor=#E9E9E9
| 207913 ||  || — || November 7, 2008 || Nogales || Tenagra II Obs. || — || align=right | 3.7 km || 
|-id=914 bgcolor=#d6d6d6
| 207914 ||  || — || November 1, 2008 || Kitt Peak || Spacewatch || — || align=right | 2.8 km || 
|-id=915 bgcolor=#E9E9E9
| 207915 ||  || — || November 2, 2008 || Catalina || CSS || — || align=right | 3.1 km || 
|-id=916 bgcolor=#d6d6d6
| 207916 ||  || — || November 4, 2008 || Kitt Peak || Spacewatch || KOR || align=right | 1.8 km || 
|-id=917 bgcolor=#E9E9E9
| 207917 ||  || — || November 7, 2008 || Mount Lemmon || Mount Lemmon Survey || — || align=right | 1.7 km || 
|-id=918 bgcolor=#E9E9E9
| 207918 ||  || — || November 8, 2008 || Kitt Peak || Spacewatch || — || align=right | 2.6 km || 
|-id=919 bgcolor=#E9E9E9
| 207919 ||  || — || November 2, 2008 || Catalina || CSS || — || align=right | 1.9 km || 
|-id=920 bgcolor=#E9E9E9
| 207920 ||  || — || November 18, 2008 || Socorro || LINEAR || — || align=right | 2.1 km || 
|-id=921 bgcolor=#E9E9E9
| 207921 ||  || — || November 18, 2008 || Catalina || CSS || — || align=right | 3.3 km || 
|-id=922 bgcolor=#E9E9E9
| 207922 ||  || — || November 17, 2008 || Kitt Peak || Spacewatch || HEN || align=right | 1.3 km || 
|-id=923 bgcolor=#fefefe
| 207923 ||  || — || November 18, 2008 || Kitt Peak || Spacewatch || NYS || align=right data-sort-value="0.82" | 820 m || 
|-id=924 bgcolor=#fefefe
| 207924 ||  || — || November 17, 2008 || Kitt Peak || Spacewatch || — || align=right data-sort-value="0.89" | 890 m || 
|-id=925 bgcolor=#d6d6d6
| 207925 ||  || — || November 17, 2008 || Kitt Peak || Spacewatch || — || align=right | 2.9 km || 
|-id=926 bgcolor=#E9E9E9
| 207926 ||  || — || November 19, 2008 || Socorro || LINEAR || — || align=right | 2.0 km || 
|-id=927 bgcolor=#d6d6d6
| 207927 ||  || — || November 20, 2008 || Socorro || LINEAR || HYG || align=right | 4.3 km || 
|-id=928 bgcolor=#d6d6d6
| 207928 ||  || — || November 18, 2008 || Kitt Peak || Spacewatch || KOR || align=right | 2.1 km || 
|-id=929 bgcolor=#d6d6d6
| 207929 ||  || — || November 20, 2008 || Kitt Peak || Spacewatch || — || align=right | 4.6 km || 
|-id=930 bgcolor=#d6d6d6
| 207930 ||  || — || December 2, 2008 || Kitt Peak || Spacewatch || KOR || align=right | 1.7 km || 
|-id=931 bgcolor=#E9E9E9
| 207931 Weihai ||  ||  || December 24, 2008 || Weihai || Shandong University Obs. || — || align=right | 1.6 km || 
|-id=932 bgcolor=#d6d6d6
| 207932 ||  || — || December 21, 2008 || Mount Lemmon || Mount Lemmon Survey || — || align=right | 3.3 km || 
|-id=933 bgcolor=#d6d6d6
| 207933 ||  || — || December 21, 2008 || Mount Lemmon || Mount Lemmon Survey || — || align=right | 4.0 km || 
|-id=934 bgcolor=#E9E9E9
| 207934 ||  || — || December 21, 2008 || Mount Lemmon || Mount Lemmon Survey || AST || align=right | 3.4 km || 
|-id=935 bgcolor=#fefefe
| 207935 || 2009 AF || — || January 1, 2009 || RAS || A. Lowe || V || align=right | 1.1 km || 
|-id=936 bgcolor=#fefefe
| 207936 || 4511 P-L || — || September 24, 1960 || Palomar || PLS || FLO || align=right data-sort-value="0.71" | 710 m || 
|-id=937 bgcolor=#d6d6d6
| 207937 || 3367 T-2 || — || September 25, 1973 || Palomar || PLS || HYG || align=right | 5.4 km || 
|-id=938 bgcolor=#fefefe
| 207938 || 2108 T-3 || — || October 16, 1977 || Palomar || PLS || — || align=right data-sort-value="0.85" | 850 m || 
|-id=939 bgcolor=#E9E9E9
| 207939 || 3205 T-3 || — || October 16, 1977 || Palomar || PLS || — || align=right | 3.3 km || 
|-id=940 bgcolor=#fefefe
| 207940 || 3518 T-3 || — || October 16, 1977 || Palomar || PLS || — || align=right | 1.2 km || 
|-id=941 bgcolor=#fefefe
| 207941 || 3827 T-3 || — || October 16, 1977 || Palomar || PLS || MAS || align=right data-sort-value="0.93" | 930 m || 
|-id=942 bgcolor=#fefefe
| 207942 || 4291 T-3 || — || October 16, 1977 || Palomar || PLS || — || align=right | 1.4 km || 
|-id=943 bgcolor=#FA8072
| 207943 ||  || — || June 25, 1979 || Siding Spring || E. F. Helin, S. J. Bus || — || align=right | 1.4 km || 
|-id=944 bgcolor=#E9E9E9
| 207944 ||  || — || March 1, 1981 || Siding Spring || S. J. Bus || — || align=right | 3.3 km || 
|-id=945 bgcolor=#FFC2E0
| 207945 || 1991 JW || — || May 8, 1991 || Palomar || K. J. Lawrence, E. F. Helin || APOPHAcritical || align=right data-sort-value="0.42" | 420 m || 
|-id=946 bgcolor=#fefefe
| 207946 ||  || — || October 6, 1991 || Palomar || A. Lowe || — || align=right | 1.3 km || 
|-id=947 bgcolor=#E9E9E9
| 207947 ||  || — || October 6, 1991 || Palomar || A. Lowe || MAR || align=right | 1.5 km || 
|-id=948 bgcolor=#d6d6d6
| 207948 ||  || — || March 17, 1993 || La Silla || UESAC || — || align=right | 4.7 km || 
|-id=949 bgcolor=#d6d6d6
| 207949 ||  || — || March 19, 1993 || La Silla || UESAC || HYG || align=right | 4.0 km || 
|-id=950 bgcolor=#E9E9E9
| 207950 ||  || — || October 12, 1993 || Kitt Peak || Spacewatch || AGN || align=right | 1.5 km || 
|-id=951 bgcolor=#d6d6d6
| 207951 ||  || — || January 7, 1994 || Kitt Peak || Spacewatch || — || align=right | 2.5 km || 
|-id=952 bgcolor=#d6d6d6
| 207952 ||  || — || April 6, 1994 || Kitt Peak || Spacewatch || EOS || align=right | 6.1 km || 
|-id=953 bgcolor=#E9E9E9
| 207953 ||  || — || August 12, 1994 || La Silla || E. W. Elst || — || align=right | 1.8 km || 
|-id=954 bgcolor=#fefefe
| 207954 ||  || — || September 5, 1994 || La Silla || E. W. Elst || — || align=right | 1.3 km || 
|-id=955 bgcolor=#E9E9E9
| 207955 ||  || — || October 28, 1994 || Kitt Peak || Spacewatch || — || align=right | 1.9 km || 
|-id=956 bgcolor=#E9E9E9
| 207956 ||  || — || February 24, 1995 || Kitt Peak || Spacewatch || DOR || align=right | 3.2 km || 
|-id=957 bgcolor=#fefefe
| 207957 ||  || — || March 25, 1995 || Kitt Peak || Spacewatch || FLO || align=right | 1.1 km || 
|-id=958 bgcolor=#fefefe
| 207958 ||  || — || July 1, 1995 || Kitt Peak || Spacewatch || — || align=right | 1.0 km || 
|-id=959 bgcolor=#fefefe
| 207959 ||  || — || July 24, 1995 || Kitt Peak || Spacewatch || — || align=right | 1.2 km || 
|-id=960 bgcolor=#d6d6d6
| 207960 ||  || — || July 30, 1995 || Kitt Peak || Spacewatch || EOS || align=right | 2.9 km || 
|-id=961 bgcolor=#d6d6d6
| 207961 ||  || — || July 27, 1995 || Kitt Peak || Spacewatch || — || align=right | 3.3 km || 
|-id=962 bgcolor=#d6d6d6
| 207962 ||  || — || September 18, 1995 || Kitt Peak || Spacewatch || — || align=right | 3.4 km || 
|-id=963 bgcolor=#d6d6d6
| 207963 ||  || — || September 18, 1995 || Kitt Peak || Spacewatch || — || align=right | 5.3 km || 
|-id=964 bgcolor=#d6d6d6
| 207964 ||  || — || September 21, 1995 || Kitt Peak || Spacewatch || EOS || align=right | 2.7 km || 
|-id=965 bgcolor=#fefefe
| 207965 ||  || — || October 19, 1995 || Kitt Peak || Spacewatch || MAS || align=right | 1.1 km || 
|-id=966 bgcolor=#E9E9E9
| 207966 ||  || — || October 19, 1995 || Kitt Peak || Spacewatch || — || align=right | 1.7 km || 
|-id=967 bgcolor=#fefefe
| 207967 ||  || — || October 19, 1995 || Kitt Peak || Spacewatch || — || align=right data-sort-value="0.60" | 600 m || 
|-id=968 bgcolor=#E9E9E9
| 207968 ||  || — || November 15, 1995 || Kitt Peak || Spacewatch || — || align=right | 1.1 km || 
|-id=969 bgcolor=#E9E9E9
| 207969 ||  || — || January 12, 1996 || Kitt Peak || Spacewatch || RAF || align=right | 1.1 km || 
|-id=970 bgcolor=#FFC2E0
| 207970 ||  || — || January 29, 1996 || Kitt Peak || Spacewatch || AMO +1kmcritical || align=right data-sort-value="0.85" | 850 m || 
|-id=971 bgcolor=#fefefe
| 207971 ||  || — || May 12, 1996 || Kitt Peak || Spacewatch || FLO || align=right | 2.2 km || 
|-id=972 bgcolor=#E9E9E9
| 207972 ||  || — || May 11, 1996 || Kitt Peak || Spacewatch || — || align=right | 3.3 km || 
|-id=973 bgcolor=#fefefe
| 207973 ||  || — || August 14, 1996 || Haleakala || NEAT || H || align=right data-sort-value="0.99" | 990 m || 
|-id=974 bgcolor=#FA8072
| 207974 ||  || — || September 8, 1996 || Haleakala || NEAT || — || align=right | 1.3 km || 
|-id=975 bgcolor=#fefefe
| 207975 ||  || — || October 12, 1996 || Catalina || T. B. Spahr || — || align=right | 2.7 km || 
|-id=976 bgcolor=#fefefe
| 207976 ||  || — || October 11, 1996 || Kitt Peak || Spacewatch || — || align=right | 1.5 km || 
|-id=977 bgcolor=#fefefe
| 207977 ||  || — || October 12, 1996 || Kitt Peak || Spacewatch || — || align=right | 1.1 km || 
|-id=978 bgcolor=#d6d6d6
| 207978 ||  || — || November 5, 1996 || Kitt Peak || Spacewatch || — || align=right | 2.6 km || 
|-id=979 bgcolor=#d6d6d6
| 207979 ||  || — || November 9, 1996 || Kitt Peak || Spacewatch || — || align=right | 3.3 km || 
|-id=980 bgcolor=#d6d6d6
| 207980 ||  || — || November 10, 1996 || Kitt Peak || Spacewatch || EMA || align=right | 3.7 km || 
|-id=981 bgcolor=#fefefe
| 207981 ||  || — || December 6, 1996 || Kitt Peak || Spacewatch || V || align=right data-sort-value="0.88" | 880 m || 
|-id=982 bgcolor=#E9E9E9
| 207982 ||  || — || January 2, 1997 || Kitt Peak || Spacewatch || — || align=right | 1.5 km || 
|-id=983 bgcolor=#d6d6d6
| 207983 ||  || — || March 30, 1997 || Kitt Peak || Spacewatch || 7:4 || align=right | 6.7 km || 
|-id=984 bgcolor=#E9E9E9
| 207984 ||  || — || October 2, 1997 || Caussols || ODAS || — || align=right | 3.1 km || 
|-id=985 bgcolor=#fefefe
| 207985 ||  || — || November 22, 1997 || Kitt Peak || Spacewatch || FLO || align=right data-sort-value="0.72" | 720 m || 
|-id=986 bgcolor=#fefefe
| 207986 ||  || — || November 23, 1997 || Kitt Peak || Spacewatch || FLO || align=right data-sort-value="0.67" | 670 m || 
|-id=987 bgcolor=#fefefe
| 207987 ||  || — || November 21, 1997 || Kitt Peak || Spacewatch || FLO || align=right data-sort-value="0.89" | 890 m || 
|-id=988 bgcolor=#E9E9E9
| 207988 ||  || — || February 23, 1998 || Kitt Peak || Spacewatch || — || align=right | 1.8 km || 
|-id=989 bgcolor=#fefefe
| 207989 ||  || — || February 24, 1998 || Kitt Peak || Spacewatch || V || align=right | 1.1 km || 
|-id=990 bgcolor=#fefefe
| 207990 ||  || — || March 2, 1998 || Caussols || ODAS || — || align=right | 1.1 km || 
|-id=991 bgcolor=#fefefe
| 207991 ||  || — || March 1, 1998 || La Silla || E. W. Elst || — || align=right | 1.2 km || 
|-id=992 bgcolor=#fefefe
| 207992 ||  || — || March 20, 1998 || Kitt Peak || Spacewatch || SUL || align=right | 2.5 km || 
|-id=993 bgcolor=#d6d6d6
| 207993 ||  || — || March 20, 1998 || Socorro || LINEAR || TIR || align=right | 3.2 km || 
|-id=994 bgcolor=#fefefe
| 207994 ||  || — || March 20, 1998 || Socorro || LINEAR || V || align=right | 1.0 km || 
|-id=995 bgcolor=#fefefe
| 207995 ||  || — || March 24, 1998 || Socorro || LINEAR || — || align=right | 1.3 km || 
|-id=996 bgcolor=#d6d6d6
| 207996 ||  || — || April 2, 1998 || Socorro || LINEAR || — || align=right | 4.8 km || 
|-id=997 bgcolor=#d6d6d6
| 207997 ||  || — || April 24, 1998 || Kitt Peak || Spacewatch || HYG || align=right | 3.3 km || 
|-id=998 bgcolor=#d6d6d6
| 207998 ||  || — || April 21, 1998 || Socorro || LINEAR || — || align=right | 5.3 km || 
|-id=999 bgcolor=#fefefe
| 207999 ||  || — || April 21, 1998 || Socorro || LINEAR || — || align=right | 1.5 km || 
|-id=000 bgcolor=#fefefe
| 208000 ||  || — || April 20, 1998 || Socorro || LINEAR || — || align=right | 2.7 km || 
|}

References

External links 
 Discovery Circumstances: Numbered Minor Planets (205001)–(210000) (IAU Minor Planet Center)

0207